= George Grove =

English engineer and writer (1820–1900)

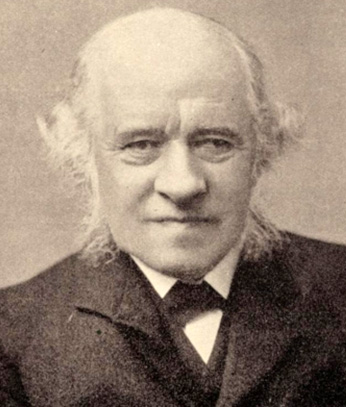
- Photograph published in Oct. 1897 issue of The Musical Times
- Born: 13 August 1820; Clapham, London, England
- Died: 28 May 1900 (aged 79); Sydenham, London, England

Academic work
- Notable works: A Dictionary of Music and Musicians

Sir George Grove CB (13 August 1820 – 28 May 1900) was an English engineer and writer on music, known as the founding editor of Grove's Dictionary of Music and Musicians.

Grove was trained as a civil engineer, and successful in that profession, but his love of music drew him into musical administration. When responsible for the regular orchestral concerts at the Crystal Palace, he wrote a series of programme notes from which eventually grew his musical dictionary. His interest in the music of Franz Schubert, which was neglected in England at that point in the nineteenth century, led him and his friend Arthur Sullivan to go to Vienna in search of undiscovered Schubert manuscripts. Their researches led to their discovery of the lost score of Schubert's Rosamunde music, several of his symphonies and other music in 1867, leading to a revival of interest in Schubert's work.

Grove was the first director of the Royal College of Music, from its foundation in 1883 until his retirement in 1894. He recruited leading musicians including Hubert Parry and Charles Villiers Stanford as members of the college faculty and established a close working relationship with London's older conservatoire, the Royal Academy of Music.

In addition to his musical work, Grove had a deep and scholarly knowledge of the Bible. He contributed to the English literature on the subject, including a concordance in 1854 and about a thousand pages of Sir William Smith's 1863 Bible Dictionary. He was a co-founder of the Palestine Exploration Fund.

== Biography ==
=== Early years ===
Grove was born in Clapham, the eighth of the eleven children of Thomas Grove (1774–1852), fishmonger and venison dealer, and his wife, Mary (née Blades; 1784–1856). A younger sister, Eleanor, was the founding principal of College Hall, London.

He went to a preparatory school, on Clapham Common, where one of his schoolfellows was George Granville Bradley, later Dean of Westminster, whose sister Grove subsequently married. He next entered Stockwell (later known as Clapham) Grammar School, run by Charles Pritchard, the astronomer, who was inspired by the progressive principles of King's College, London. The educational curriculum was based on classics, divinity, mathematics and natural philosophy, and rigorously tested by annual examination. Pritchard also encouraged his pupils to develop interests in literature and music.

Grove was a regular worshipper at Holy Trinity, Clapham, where he listened to the music of Bach and Handel. By the age of sixteen, he was competent in classics and mathematics; he left the school in 1836 and was apprenticed to Alexander Gordon, a well-known civil engineer in Westminster. In his free time, he immersed himself in music, attending concerts and studying scores.

After completing his apprenticeship, Grove was admitted as a graduate of the Institution of Civil Engineers, in 1839. A year later he went to Glasgow, gaining further experience in the factory of Robert Napier. In 1841, Grove had an affair with a woman called Elizabeth Blackwell, who gave birth to his illegitimate son, George Grove-Blackwell, in March 1842. Between 1841 and 1846, Grove spent most of his time in the West Indies, as resident engineer during the building of cast-iron lighthouses.

After this he joined the staff of the Chester and Holyhead Railway and then became assistant to Edwin Clark, working on the Britannia Bridge across the Menai Strait. An account of the first floating of the tubes of the bridge is recorded in The Spectator of 23 June 1849, which was Grove's first appearance in print. During this period, he lived in Chester, hearing music in the cathedral and also becoming familiar with Welsh folksong.

=== Music and biblical scholarship ===
While working on the Britannia Bridge Grove came into contact with Robert Stephenson, Isambard Kingdom Brunel, Sir Charles Barry and other eminent visitors to the works. "These distinguished men", Grove later recalled, "noticed me and were as good as gold to me. They counselled me to go to London and forced me into the secretaryship of the Society of Arts, then vacant by the retirement of Mr. Scott Russell." This was in 1849, when the Great Exhibition of 1851 was in preparation. Grove was the society's secretary for the duration of the exhibition.

On 23 December 1851, he married Harriet Bradley, daughter of Charles Bradley and sister of his old school friend George Bradley. After the Great Exhibition closed in 1852, its principal building, known as "the Crystal Palace", was dismantled and rebuilt in the south London suburb of Sydenham as a centre for education, the arts and leisure. Grove was appointed secretary of the Crystal Palace. He engaged a wind band and a conductor, Heinrich Schallehn. The latter was found to be unsatisfactory, and was replaced by August Manns, who, with Grove's encouragement, developed the band into a full-sized symphony orchestra. With programmes chosen by Grove and Manns, the Crystal Palace concerts became a central feature of London's musical scene and remained so until the end of the century.

Grove wrote the programme notes for the concerts. In 1901, a biographer wrote:

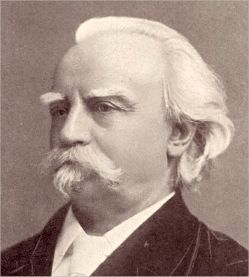
August Manns, Grove's musical director

The daily and weekly orchestral performances at Sydenham prompted those admirable analytical notices of musical compositions with which the name of George Grove was so long and is so favourably associated. He had always shown a great fondness for music, but had never received any technical training in the art. Entirely self-taught, his knowledge was acquired solely by 'picking up' information. "I wish it to be distinctly understood," he said, "that I have always been a mere amateur in music. I wrote about the symphonies and concertos because I wished to try to make them clear to myself and to discover the secret of the things that charmed me so; and from that sprang a wish to make other amateurs see it in the same way."

Grove's musical analyses avoided all hint of technical jargon and tried to make clear to everyone who read them what, in Grove's opinion, listeners should be aware of in each piece. In a note on Mozart's Symphony No. 39, after referring to Mozart's extraordinary productivity in the year 1788, Grove wrote:

The circumstances which necessitated such fearful exertion on this and many other occasions in Mozart's life we have no means of ascertaining. Whatever they were, they were in accordance with a common custom of Nature. She seems to delight in condemning her most gifted sons to an ordeal the very reverse of that which we should anticipate. It seems equally true in Art and in Morals, that it is not by indulgence and favour, but by difficulty and trouble, that the spirit is formed; and in all ages of the world our Davids, Shakspeares, Dantes, Mozarts, and Beethovens must submit to processes which none but their great spirits could survive – to a fiery trial of poverty, ill health, neglect, and misunderstanding – and be "tried as silver is tried," that they may become the teachers of their fellow-men to all time, and shine, like stars in the firmament, for ever and ever.

Grove's Crystal Palace programme notes did not concentrate solely on his favourite Austro-German composers. He embraced a representative selection of composers, notably the Frenchmen Berlioz, Bizet, Delibes, Gounod, Massenet and Saint-Saëns, and the rising generations of British composers – Arthur Sullivan, Hubert Parry, Charles Villiers Stanford, Hamish MacCunn, Edward German and Granville Bantock.

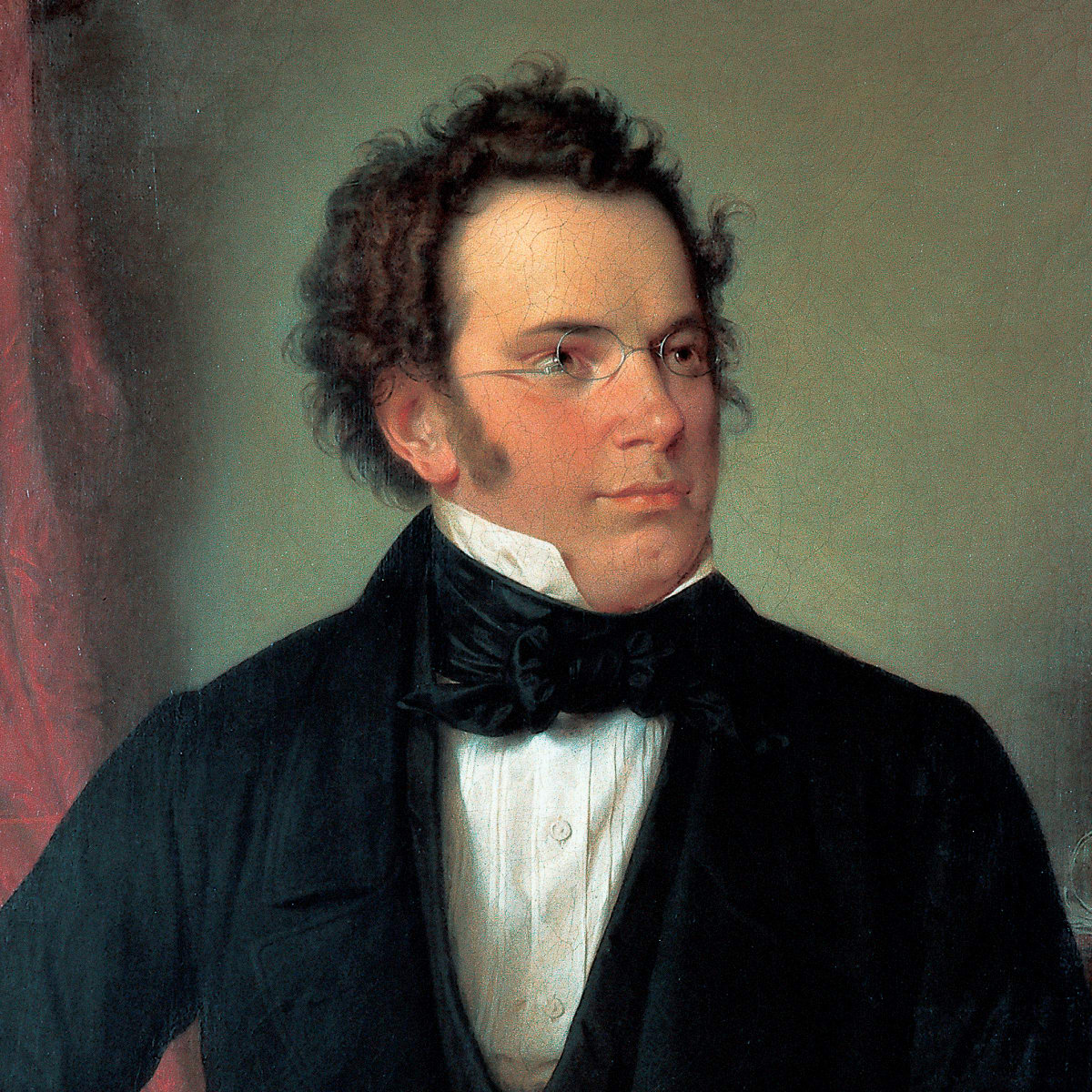
Franz Schubert, whose music Grove and Arthur Sullivan rediscovered in 1867

Among the composers whom Grove sought to popularise was Schubert, whose music was largely neglected in England. Grove and Manns presented the first performance in England of the Great C major Symphony. Together with his friend Arthur Sullivan, Grove went to Vienna in 1867 in search of Schubert manuscripts. They found several of Schubert's symphonies and much other music, some of which they copied. They were particularly excited about their final discovery, which Grove described thus: "I found, at the bottom of the cupboard, and in its farthest corner, a bundle of music-books two feet high, carefully tied round, and black with the undisturbed dust of nearly half-a-century. … These were the part-books of the whole of the music in Rosamunde, tied up after the second performance in December, 1823, and probably never disturbed since. Dr. Schneider [Schubert's nephew] must have been amused at our excitement; but let us hope that he recollected his own days of rapture; at any rate, he kindly overlooked it, and gave us permission to take away with us and copy what we wanted."

In the early years of the Crystal Palace, Grove devoted much of his leisure time to Biblical scholarship. Discovering that there was no full concordance of the proper names in the Bible, Grove, helped by his wife, began work in 1853 making a complete index of each occurrence of every proper name in the Bible, including the Apocrypha. Between 1860 and 1863, Grove was assistant editor to Sir William Smith in a comprehensive Bible dictionary, contributing more than a thousand pages. Some entries written by Grove, such as that on the prophet Elijah, were equivalent almost to book-length. He visited the Holy Land in 1859 and 1861, and helped to found the Palestine Exploration Fund, of which he became honorary secretary, labouring incessantly on its behalf. The Archbishop of York said that Grove was "virtually the founder and institutor of the Society, and has done wonders for it throughout." Grove later observed, "People will insist on thinking of me as a musician, which I really am not in the very least degree. I took quite as much interest in my investigations into the natural features and the little towns of Palestine which I did for Smith's Dictionary of the Bible or for Arthur Stanley's Sinai and Palestine, as I did for Beethoven and Mendelssohn, indeed perhaps more so."

=== Grove's Dictionary of Music and Musicians ===
After nearly twenty years of service at the Crystal Palace, Grove resigned the secretaryship at the end of 1873 and accepted an offer from the publishers Macmillan and Co. to join their staff and become a director of the firm. He edited Macmillan's Magazine and wrote a primer of geography for Macmillan's "History Primers". By far the most important outcome of his connection with Macmillan was A Dictionary of Music and Musicians, for which his name is best remembered. The idea of the dictionary was entirely his own. He stated, in the prospectus of the dictionary, in March 1874, that "The want of English works on the history, theory, or practice of Music, or the biographies of musicians accessible to the non-professional reader, has long been a subject of remark."

Grove conceived of a work to fill the gap he had identified; he originally proposed two volumes of about 600 pages each, but by the time of its first publication, it ran to four volumes containing a total of 3,125 pages. It was issued by Macmillan in alphabetical volumes over a 12-year period ending in 1889. Grove criticised Parry, a leading contributor, for being "inclined to be wordy and diffuse", but articles by Grove on his own particular interests, Beethoven, Mendelssohn and Schubert, were even longer. The Musical Times wrote of the work, "His masterly biographies of Beethoven, Mendelssohn, and Schubert are models of biographical literature, and are written in a most fascinating style. He made two special journeys to Germany to obtain materials for his Mendelssohn article, and more than two to Vienna in connection with Schubert and Beethoven."

=== Royal College of Music ===
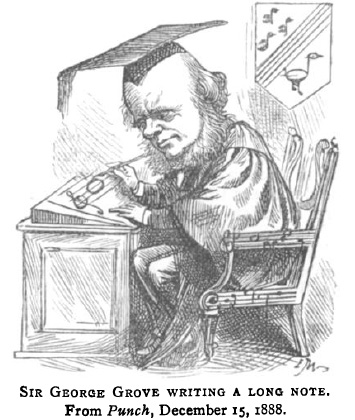
Grove as head of the Royal College of Music, as seen by Punch

In the 1880s, London's musical academies were in poor shape. The Royal Academy of Music was moribund, and the National Training School for Music, of which Sullivan was the reluctant and ineffectual head, was in financial and administrative difficulties. There was a proposal to merge the two bodies to create a single effective conservatoire, but the Royal Academy insisted on retaining its independence and later revitalised itself under the leadership of Alexander Mackenzie. The National Training School was re-formed as the Royal College of Music in 1882, and Grove was appointed its first director. Throughout 1882 he led a successful fund-raising campaign that ensured the official opening of the new college by the Prince of Wales on 7 May 1883. Grove received a knighthood on the same day. The teaching staff, whom he appointed, were led by Parry and Stanford, and, as a biographer of Grove says, "carried the college with distinction into the twentieth century."

Grove focused the college's attention on two main activities: practical training and examining. He was determined to raise the general standard of orchestral playing by replacing the existing ad hoc methods of apprentice-based training, private lessons, or study abroad. His second focus, examination, followed the Victorian trend to form professional bodies regulating and standardising the activity of members of each profession. An example is the Institution of Civil Engineers to which Grove had been admitted in 1839. When the Royal Charter establishing the college was being drawn up, Grove ensured that, unlike the Royal Academy, the college should have degree-awarding powers. Mackenzie, seeing the prospect that the new institution would overshadow the academy, successfully proposed that both bodies should award qualifications jointly. Grove agreed, realising that this course would do much to dispel the damaging hostility that existed between the academy and the college.

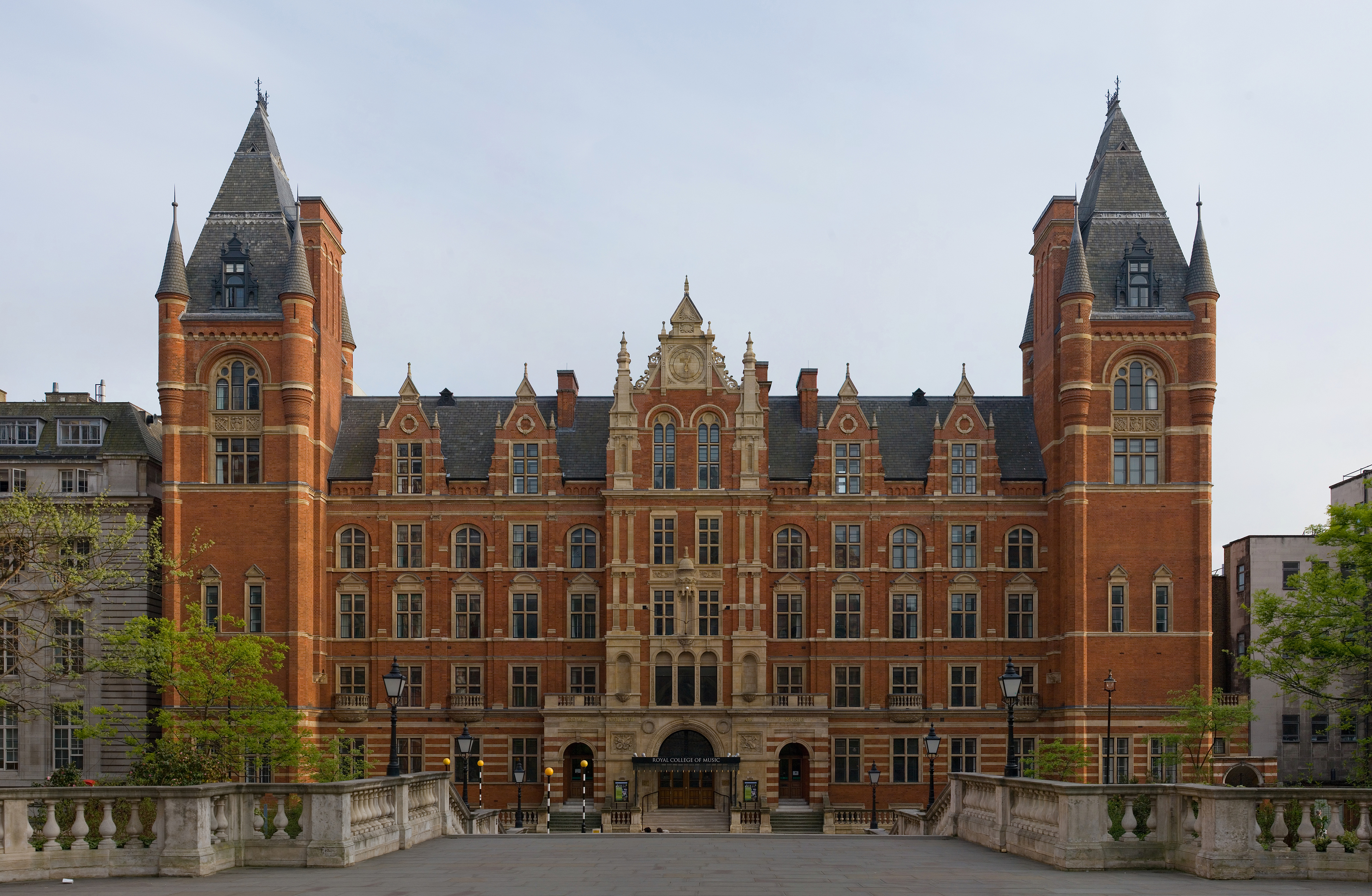
The Royal College of Music

The new Associated Board of the Royal Schools of Music thus formed offered musical qualifications to external candidates from anywhere in the British Empire who could meet its rigorous standards. 1,141 candidates entered for the first examinations in 1890, despite the high entry fee of two guineas. The income helped both institutions to keep their own student fees at an affordable level, which enabled the college to make a full three-year course of study its basic standard. Because of the thorough training thus offered, the high standard of playing of the college's students quickly became known. Leading musicians willingly appeared with the college orchestra, including Joseph Joachim and Hans Richter. Manns, Eugène Ysaÿe and Bernard Shaw praised it strongly. The historian David Wright says of Grove's legacy: "The founding of the RCM in 1883 clearly represents the major turning point for musical training in Britain. The new attitudes it espoused stemmed directly from the professionalizing ethos that modernized and transformed Victorian society."

=== Retirement and last years ===
Grove retired at Christmas 1894, when he was succeeded by Parry. By this time, a new building had been constructed for the college. Grove was elected an International Member of the American Philosophical Society in 1895. In 1896 Grove's Beethoven and his Nine Symphonies, "addressed to the amateurs of this country", appeared.

Early in 1899, Grove's health began to fail, and he died, aged 79, on 28 May 1900, in the house at Sydenham in which he had lived for nearly 40 years. He was buried in Ladywell and Brockley Cemetery.
