= Queen's College, London =

Coordinates: 51.5185°N 0.1469°W

Queen's College London

Location
- 43–49 Harley Street; London, W1G 8BT; England

Information
- Type: Private day school
- Established: 1848; 178 years ago
- Founder: Frederick Denison Maurice
- Local authority: City of Westminster
- Department for Education URN: 101157 Tables
- Chair of Governors: Alexandra Gregory and Rae Perry
- Principal: Richard Tillett
- Gender: Girls
- Age: 4 to 18
- Enrolment: 520~
- Colour
- Former pupils: Old Queen's
- Website: www.qcl.org.uk

Queen's College is a private day school for girls aged 11–18 with an adjoining prep school for girls aged 3–11 located in the City of Westminster, Greater London. It was founded in 1848 by theologian and social reformer Frederick Denison Maurice along with a committee of patrons. In 1853, it was the first girls' school to be granted a Royal Charter for the furtherance of women's education. Until 2024, the college patron had always been a British queen.

The college has a distinctly liberal ethos based upon the principles of F. D. Maurice.

== History ==
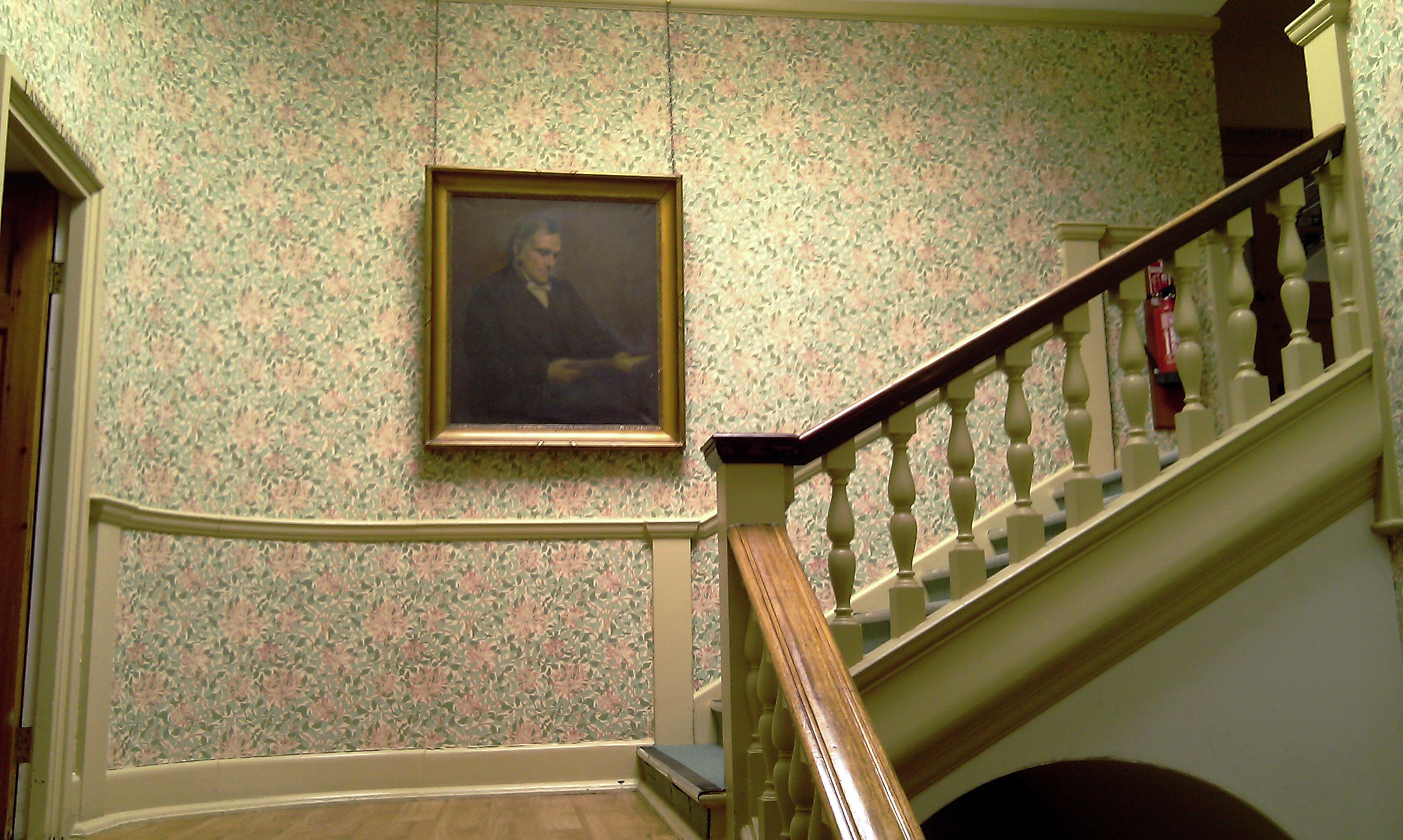
F. D. Maurice's portrait hanging on the college's staircase

In 1845, David Laing, chaplain of the Middlesex Hospital and secretary of the related Governesses' Benevolent Institution, raised funds with a committee of patrons to acquire a building at 47 Harley Street with the intention of creating a home for unemployed governesses.

Laing was keen to develop the institution to provide governesses with an education and certification. In 1847, he acquired the agreement of professors from King's College London to give lectures in the Home. Queen Victoria gave her assent, promise of funds and patronage. In 1847, the first lectures took place, the Committee of Education was established under the chair of F. D. Maurice, and number 45 was purchased. In December of the same year, the first certificates were issued. Meanwhile, it was decided to extend the reach of the education on offer to women who were not governesses.

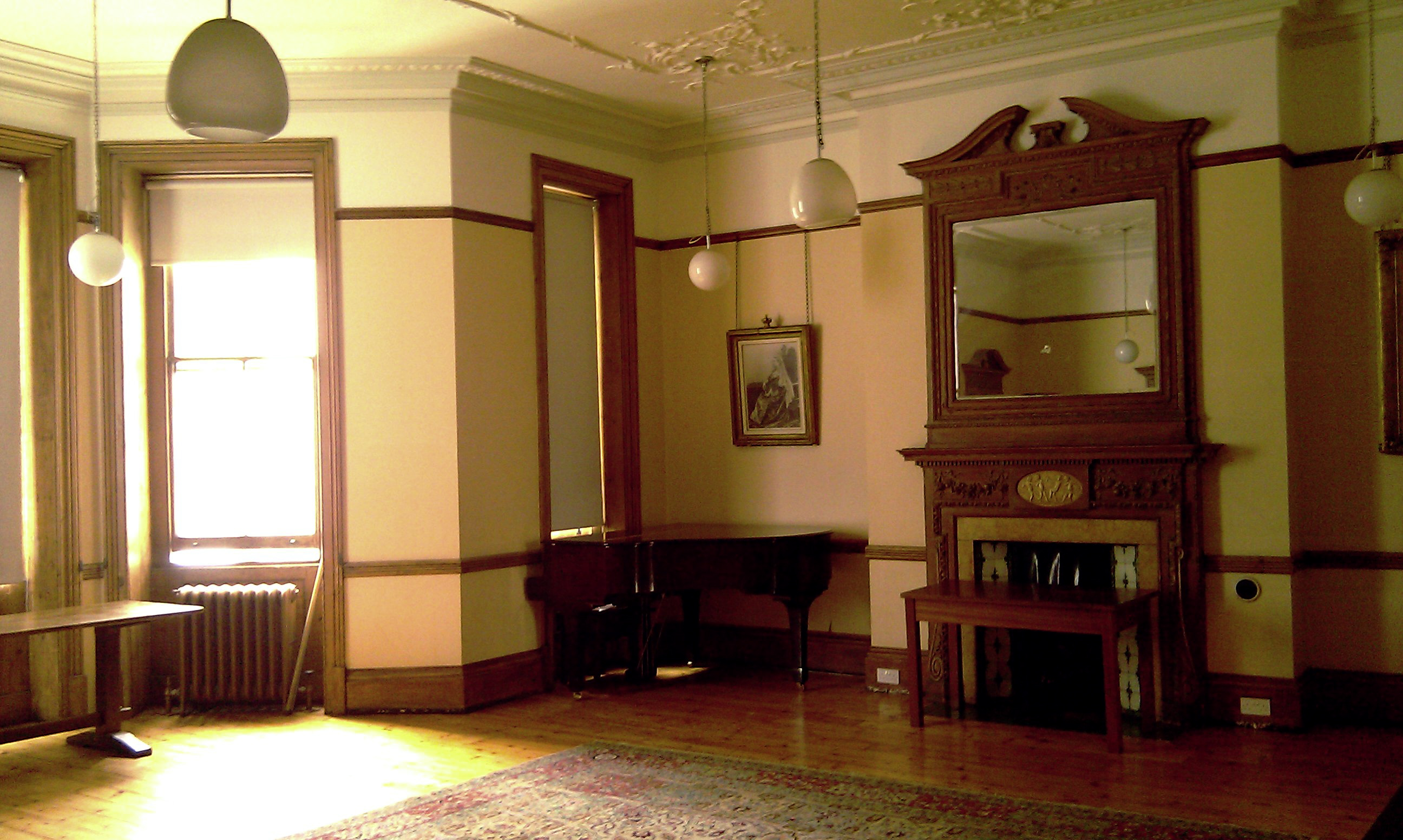
The Waiting Room

The establishment of the college was met with criticism by the press, F. D. Maurice was forced to defend the intention of teaching mathematics to women against claims of its 'dangerous' consequences.

The composers William Sterndale Bennett and John Pyke Hullah were among the founding directors.

In the early days of the college, lectures were given to a single classroom of girls ranging from 12 to 20 years of age. The younger pupils were soon to be given their own school at the back of the buildings, which was also open to boys. The Waiting Room became the place where girls would gather and be introduced by the Lady Resident to their chaperones who remained with them throughout their classes and were known as the 'Lady Visitors' (one of them being Henrietta Stanley, Baroness Stanley of Alderley). When the college was separated from the Governesses' Benevolent Institution in 1853, a new Governing Council was established, with the 'Visitor', the Bishop of London as its figurehead, an arrangement which continues to this day. Following the resignation of Maurice in 1853, Richard Chenevix Trench became the first principal and took over as Chair of the Committee of Education.

The college had resisted attempts to become, or merge with, a college of London University. The Lady Resident Eleanor Grove and linguist Rosa Morison had left together in the 1880s because of this and they returned to lead College Hall, London.

The practice of offering lectures from visitors throughout the year is a tradition of the college.

During the Second World War, the college escaped destruction when a bomb exploded on the opposite side of Harley Street. The windows at the front of the building were smashed and plaster work damaged. The college continued to function during the war with classes held in bomb shelters constructed in the main corridor. Evacuation of the pupils to the Lake District and then to Northamptonshire was short-lived.

The college ceased to offer boarding accommodation in the 1980s and Kynaston House was re-modelled from the accommodation to offices, a senior common room and a library.

== School organisation ==
Each student is assigned to a form of approximately 18–22 members. The forms are headed by a tutor and deputy, and take their name from the initials of the tutor. There are two or three forms in a year and each year is under the watch of a year head. The years comprise the three sections of the college, each with a further delegated head.

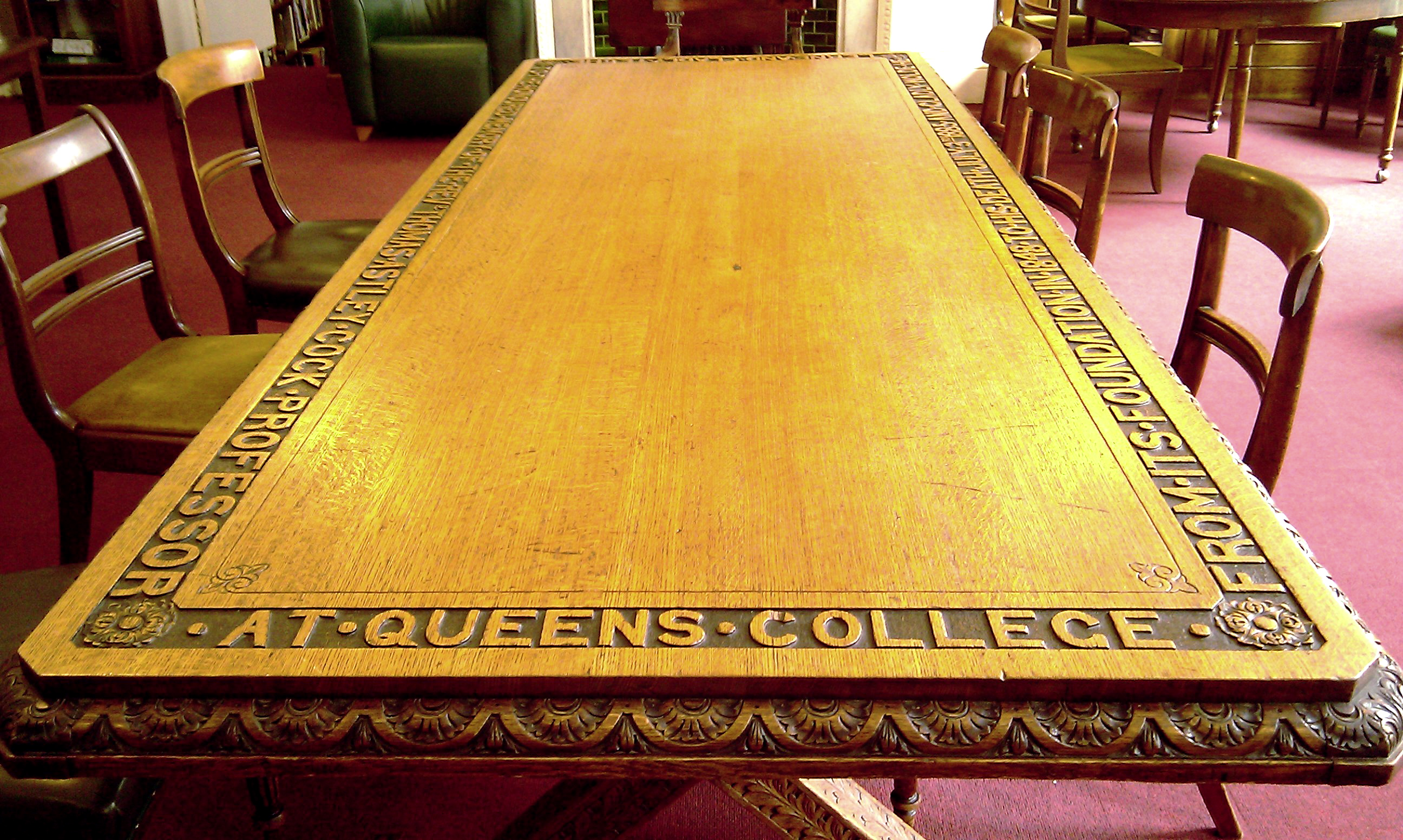
Senior Library

=== Preparatory School ===
Name	Year
Reception	Reception
Form I	Year 1
Form II	Year 2
Form III	Year 3
Form IV	Year 4
Form V	Year 5
Form VI	Year 6

=== College ===
Year group	Queen's name	Section
Year 7	Class 3	The School
Year 8	Class 2	The School
Year 9	Class 1	The School
Year 10	I Juniors	Junior College
Year 11	II Juniors	Junior College
Year 12	I Seniors	Senior College (Sixth Form)
Year 13	II Seniors	Senior College (Sixth Form)

== Ethos ==
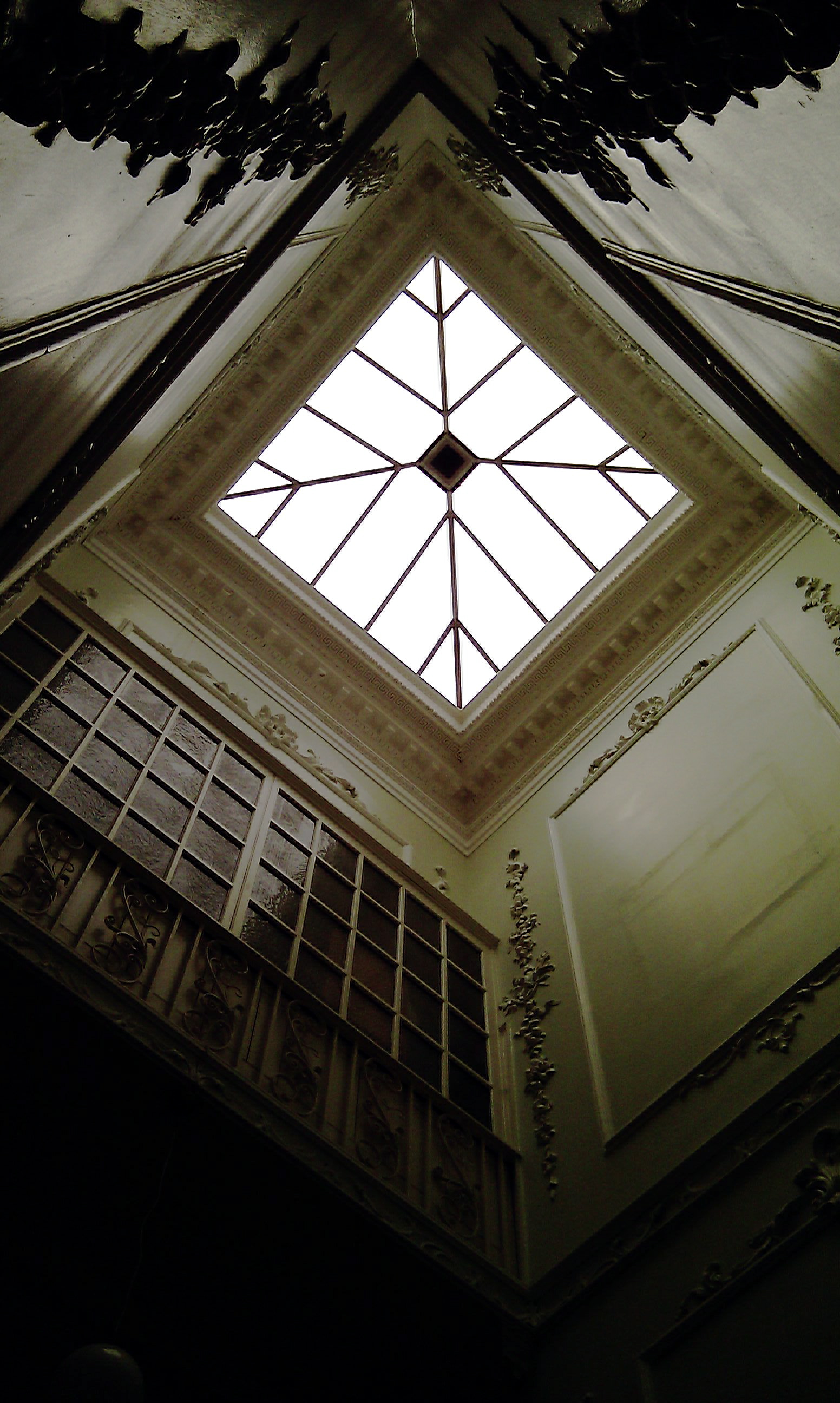
Georgian staircase

The teacher in every department, if he does his duty, will admonish his pupils that they are not to make fashion, or public opinion, their rule; that they are not to draw or play, or to study arithmetic, or language or literature or history, in order to shine or be admired; that if these are their ends, they will not be sincere in their work or do it well. — F. D. Maurice

=== Religious affiliation ===
The college is Anglican in affiliation, stemming from its foundation under Christian Socialist F. D. Maurice. Half the principals since the college's inception have been vicars or canons of the Anglican Church. Today, the college is associated with the nearby All Souls Church, Langham Place, whose vicar is the school chaplain. Prayers are said daily in the hall (except on Thursday), and the year begins with the reading of a prayer written specially for the college by Maurice. Members of other faiths are welcomed and a weekly Jewish assembly takes place.

== Calendar ==
=== Terms ===
The three terms are named Michaelmas, Lent and Summer.

At the end of the Lent Term, Founder's Day is observed, when thanks is given for the founding of the college at All Souls Church, which is also the location of the carol service at the end of the Michaelmas Term.

=== Annual Gathering ===
The Summer Term closes with the Annual Gathering, when pupils continue the tradition, begun in 1854, of lining the school corridor dressed all in white, accompanied by the staff in academic dress. The 'Visitor', the Bishop of London, or his representative, is introduced by form tutors and the Principal to every student in the college from Class 1 upwards and selected representatives of Classes 2 and 3. The event is followed by the Principal's report to the governors, parents, staff and pupils on the academic year and an address from the Visitor.

== Alumnae ==
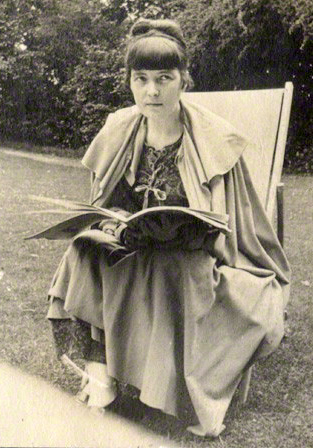
Alumna Katherine Mansfield

Founded in 1891, the Old Queen's Society exists to connect former pupils with each other and the school. The first Honorary Secretary was Frideswide Kekewich and the first President, Ellen Howard.

Known as Old Queens, alumnae have included many notable women over the school's history, including:

- Camilla Croudace, Lady Resident at Queen's College (1881–1906)
- Gertrude Bell (1884–86), archaeologist, cartologist, diplomat
- Jane Asher (1960-1962), actress and author
- Anna Wintour OBE (1960–63), editor-in-chief, Vogue
- Frances Helen Prideaux, the first woman to be competitively appointed as a surgeon to a London hospital

== Heads of Queen's College ==
Principals

F. D. Maurice (Chair of the Education Committee 1848–53)
Richard Chenevix Trench (1853–54)
A. P. Stanley (1863–1872)
J. LLewelyn Davies (1873–1874)
Edward Plumptre (1875–1879)
J. Llewelyn Davies (1879–1886)
R. Elwyn (1886–1894)
C. J. Robinson (1895–1898)
T. W. Sharpe (1898–1903)
G. C. Bell (1904–1910)
Henry Craik (1911–1915)
J. F. Kendall (1915–1918)
Joseph Edwards (1919–1931)
G. E. Holloway (1932–1940)
A. M. Kynaston (1940–1963)
Stephanie C. P. Fierz (1964–1983)
P. J. Fleming (1983–1990)
Celia Goodhart (1991–1999)
Margaret Connell (1999–2009)
Frances Ramsey (2009–2017)
Richard Tillett (2017–present)

Deans

C. G. Nicolay (1848–54)
E. Plumptre (1854–75)
Henry Craik (1875–81)
H. G. Seeley (1881–1909)
Joseph Edwards (1909–1919)
R. Bayne (1919–1922)
T. W. Crafer (1922)

Headmistresses of the School

Parry (1849–57)
Hay (1857–1893)
Palethorpe and Wood (1893–1895)
Luard (1895–1907)
Teale (1907–1919)
Position merged with Principal (1919)

== Members of staff ==
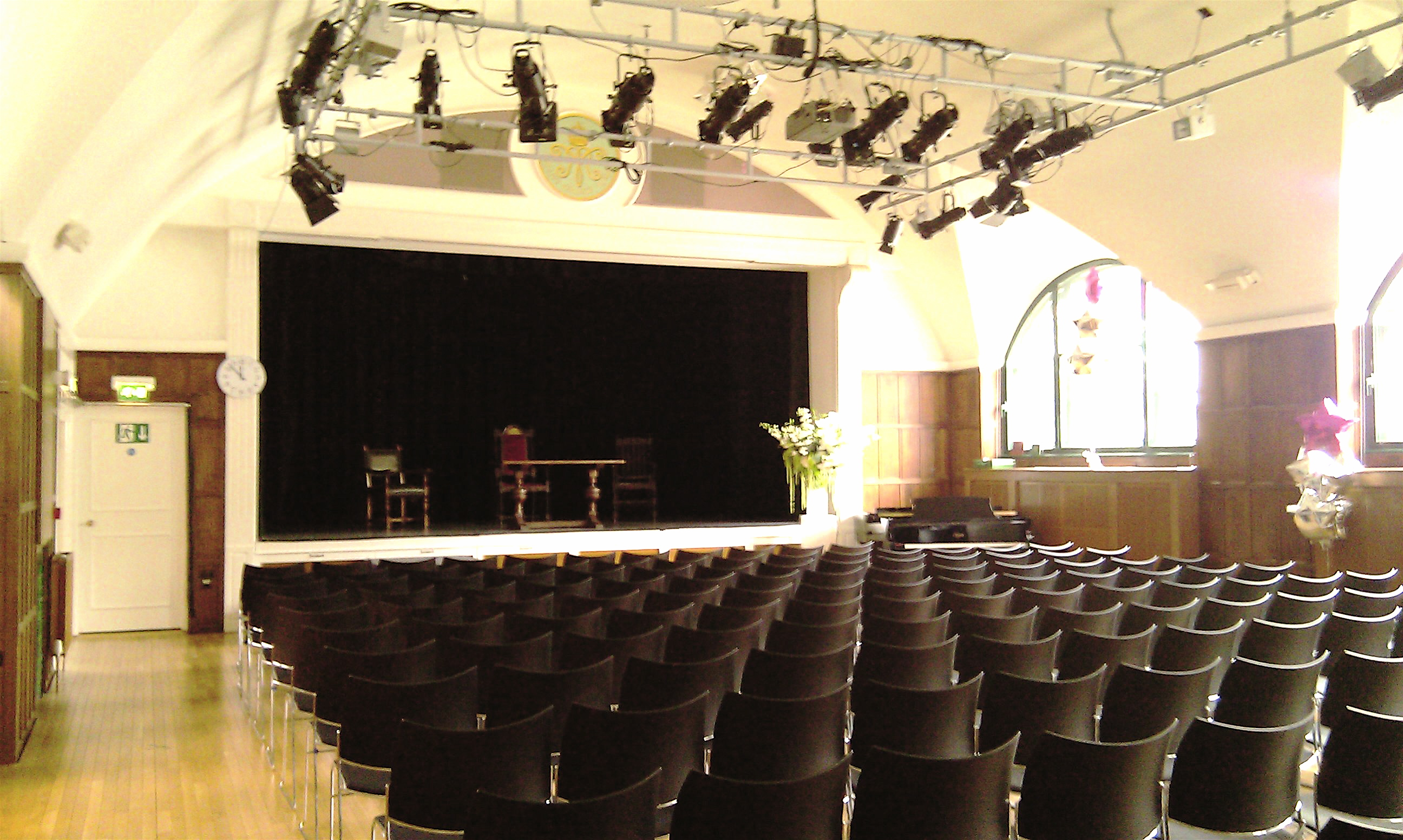
Somerville (formerly Pfeiffer) Hall

=== Former ===
- Terry Bagg, poet
- Dorothea Beale, suffragist and educational reformer
- R. C. Trench
- David Bedford, composer
- Mary Everest Boole, mathematician
- Louisa Bovell-Sturge, pioneering female doctor
- Isidore Brasseur, tutor to the Prince of Wales
- Émile Cammaerts, Belgian poet
- Richard Chenevix Trench, Dean of Westminster
- Henry Charles Innes Fripp, Professor of Art
- John Pyke Hullah, composer
- Janet Kay-Shuttleworth
- Elaine Kaye, author
- Charles Kingsley, author and social reformer
- David Laing, chaplain and secretary of the Governesses' Benevolent Institution
- Edward Collett May, music educator
- Fiona McIntosh, Olympian and former British number 1 fencer
- Tessa Millar, Olympic rower and coach
- Edward Plumptre, theologian
- Anne Smith, world record holder for running the mile in 1967
- Henrietta Maria Stanley
- William Sterndale Bennett, composer, Principal of the Royal Academy of Music
- Ethel Truman, first woman to achieve a first in physics at London University
- Richard Henry Walthew, composer

== Secondary Sources ==
- Grylls, Rosalie Glynn, Queen's College 1848–1948: Founded by Frederick Denison Maurice, London: George Routledge & Sons, 1948
- Kaye, Elaine, A History of Queen's College, London 1848–1972, London: Chatto & Windus, 1972
- Billings, Malcolm, Queen's College: 150 Years and a New Century, London: James & James, 2000
