= Camilla Croudace =

British supporter of education for women

- Born: 29 January 1844; Homerton, Middlesex, England
- Died: 3 April 1926 (aged 82); Worthing, West Sussex, England
- Education: Queens College London
- Employer: Queens College London
- Known for: Queens College London Lady Resident

Camilla Croudace (29 January 1844 – 3 April 1926) was a British supporter of education for women serving from 1881 to 1906 as Lady Resident at Queens College London.

== Life ==
Croudace was born in Homerton in 1844 to Thomas and Ann Croudace. Her mother was Ann Hester "Camilla" Vignoles and her maternal grandfather was the leading civil engineer Charles Vignoles who built huge bridges. Her mother was christened Ann Hester because her mother was too ill to advise and her father was away, but she too was called "Camilla".

Croudace was educated in London where she went to secondary school at Queens College London where she greatly admired the school's founder F. D. Maurice. Other notable teachers there were Dorothea Beale, R. C. Trench and E. H. Plumptre.

After she left the school she worked as a governess, before she was invited back to become the "Lady Resident". It was not her role to teach but to look after the girls and to ensure discipline and the school's ethos was upheld.

Croudace would invite her favourite pupils to tea. Katherine Mansfield was one of her student admirers and one of her most brilliant students was the traveller Gertrude Bell.
