= Connaught Hall, London =

Intercollegiate hall of residence of the University of London

Coordinates: 51.52458°N 0.12975°W

Connaught Hall is a fully catered hall of residence owned by the University of London and situated on Tavistock Square, Bloomsbury, London, UK. It is an intercollegiate hall, and as such provides accommodation for full-time students at constituent colleges and institutions of the University of London, including King's College, University College London (UCL), Queen Mary, the London School of Economics (LSE) and the School of Oriental and African Studies and others.

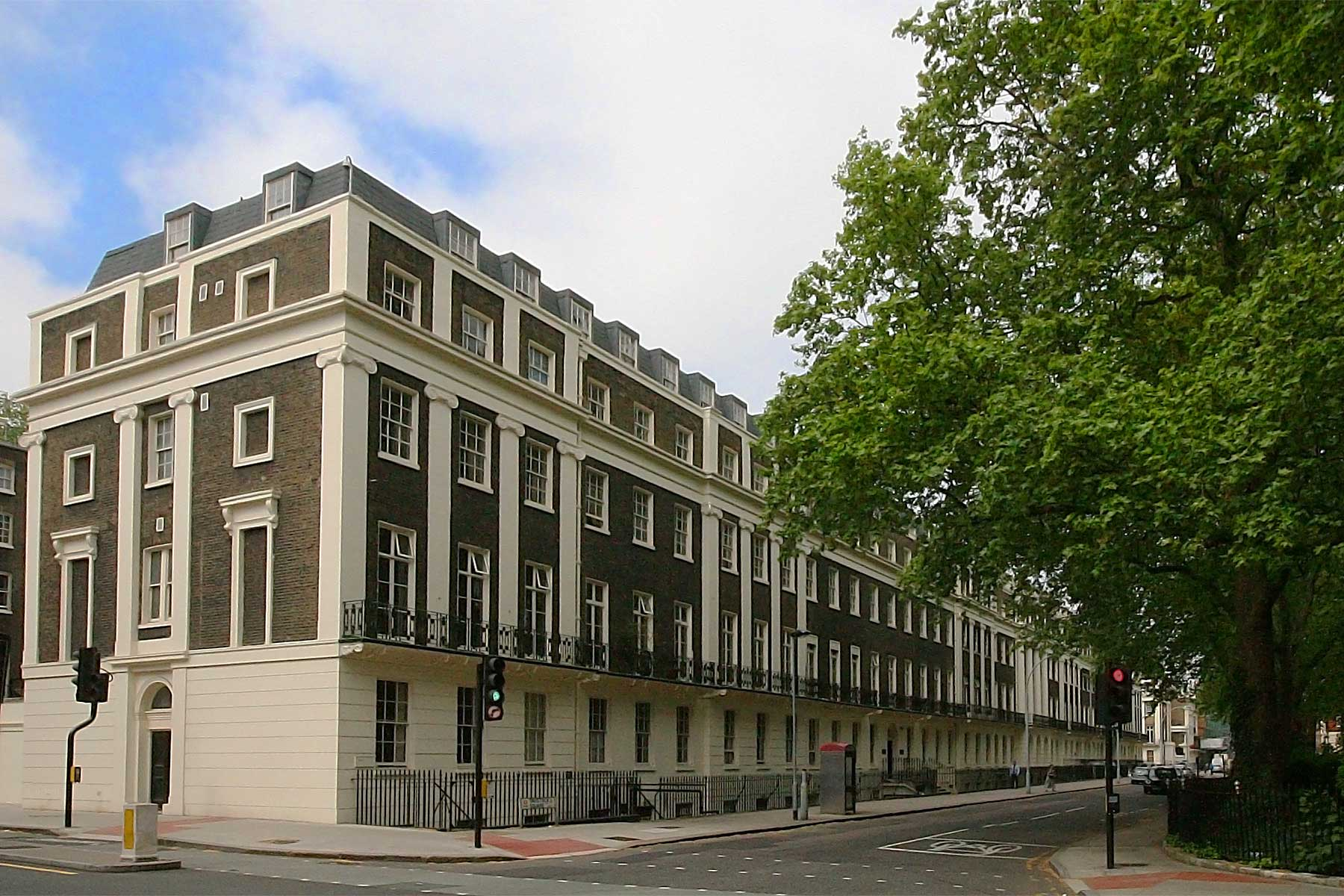
Connaught Hall, University of London: 36–45 Tavistock Square, London WC1H 9EX

== History ==
Connaught Hall was established in 1919 by Prince Arthur, Duke of Connaught and Strathearn – the third son of Queen Victoria – at 18 Torrington Square, London as a men-only private hall of residence; the Hall was intended as a memorial to the Duchess of Connaught who died in 1917. The Duke gave the Hall to the University of London in 1928. It was not until 1961 that Connaught Hall moved out of Torrington Square to its present location in Tavistock Square: a converted Georgian terrace with a Grade II listed façade. Connaught Hall accommodated only men until 2001, when it was changed to a mixed sex hall as part of a major review of the intercollegiate halls of residence.

== Student population ==
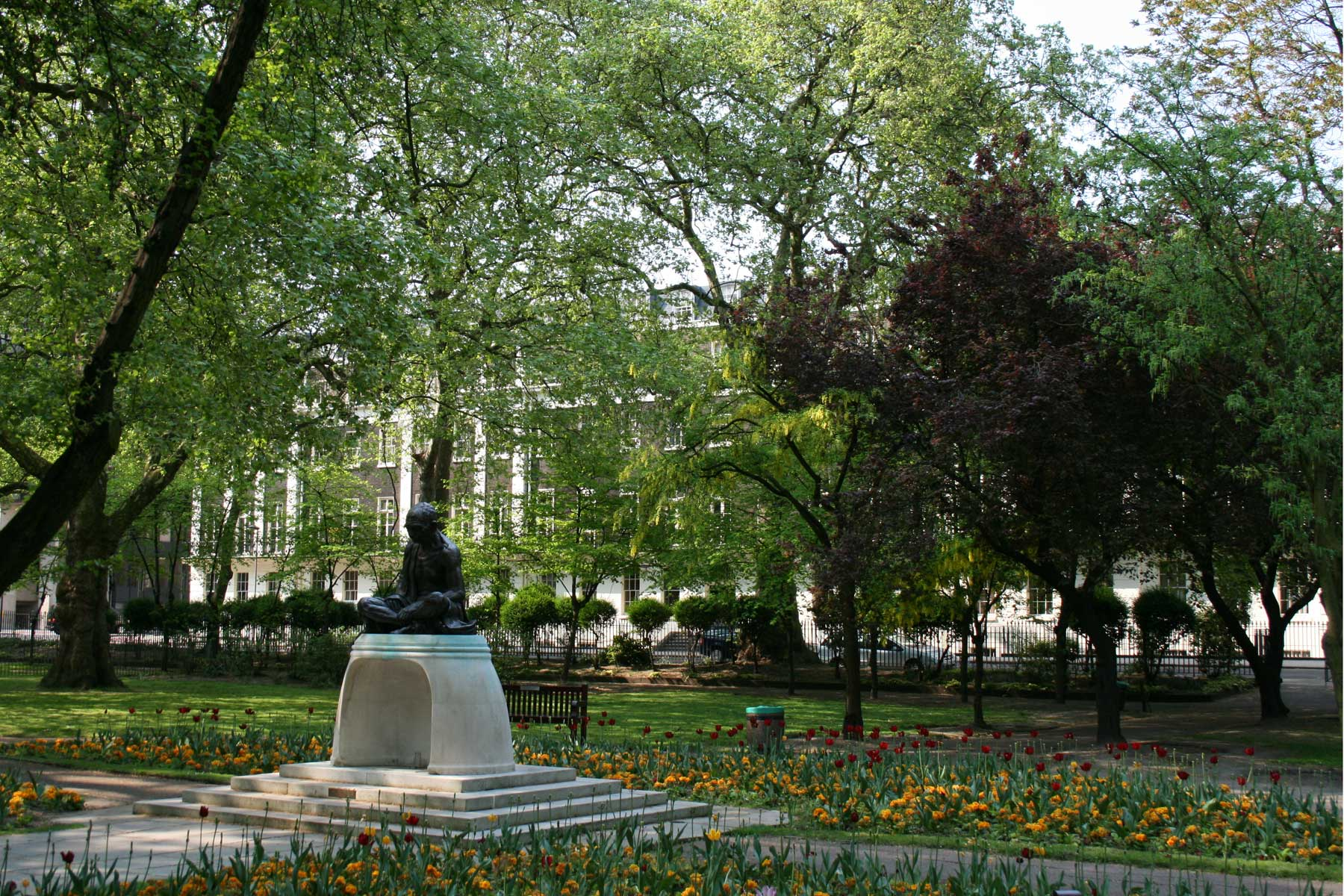
Tavistock Square in springtime, Connaught Hall just visible in the background

For over 90 years, Connaught Hall accommodated only male students; female students were admitted for the first time in September 2001 as part of a wider review of the intercollegiate halls. Now one of eight University of London intercollegiate halls of residence, Connaught Hall accommodates 214 full-time students of the various colleges and institutes of the university; there is an even mix of men and women, and a diverse range of cultural and social backgrounds. The number of students from each college who are accommodated at Connaught Hall is determined from time to time by the Intercollegiate Accommodation Committee of the University of London, in negotiation with the accommodation offices of the individual colleges. The majority of residents are first-year undergraduates ("freshers"), and most will only ever spend one year in a hall of residence: around 10% are allowed to return for a second year at the Warden's discretion; these will usually be either students with special circumstances or those who have made an outstanding contribution to the Hall community. Approximately 10% of residents are postgraduates, and about a third are overseas students.

== Accommodation and facilities ==
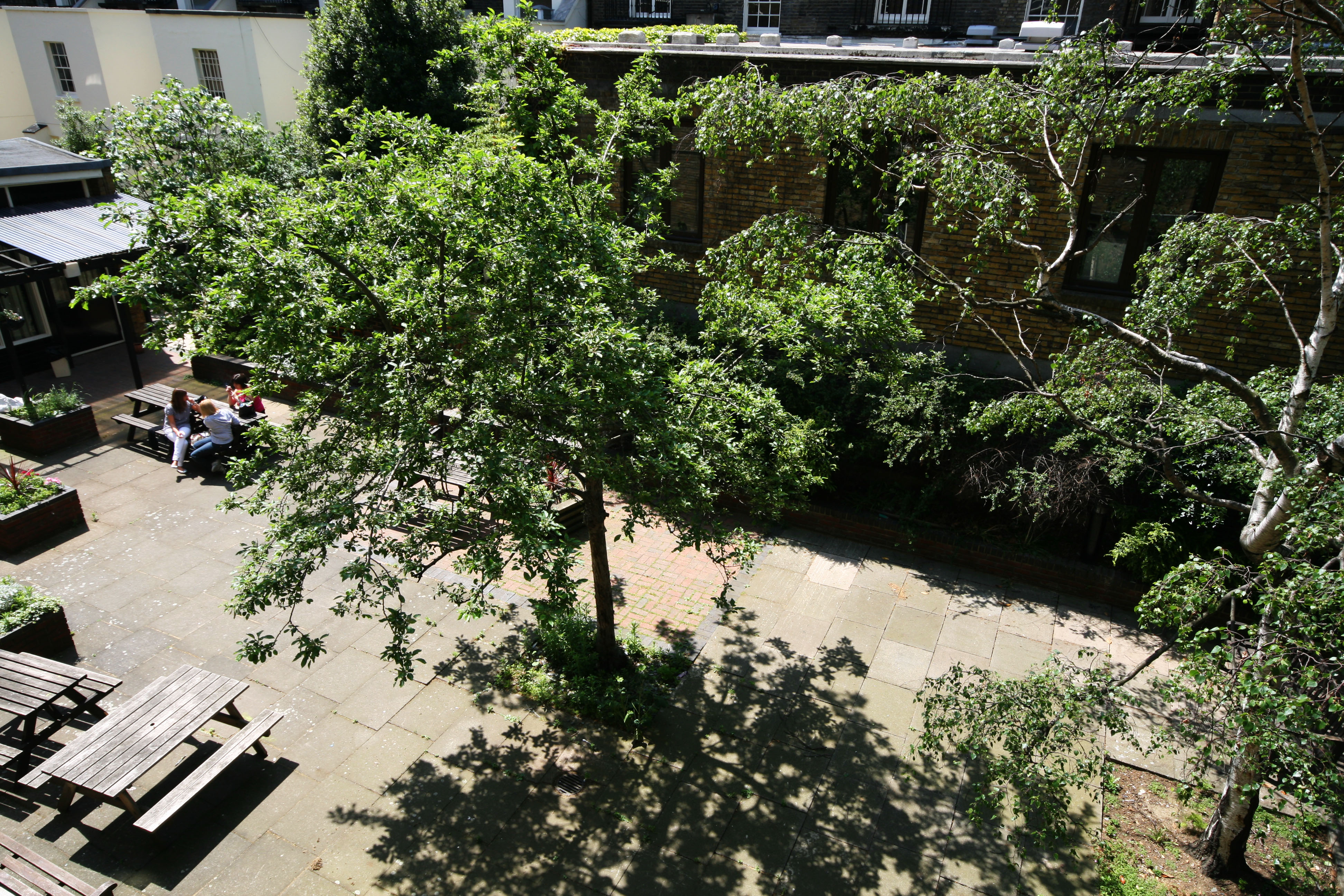
Connaught Hall's private courtyard garden, with the bar terrace at the top of the picture

Most accommodation is in single study-bedrooms (204 single rooms), but there are five twin rooms for students who prefer to share; every room has a washbasin, but toilet and shower facilities are all shared (20–25 students sharing one bathroom, each with three showers & two or three toilet stalls). There are two television/common rooms, music room with a piano, restaurant, card-operated laundrette, secure bike store, courtyard garden and a study room. There is one vending machine for soft drinks, and a small pantry/kitchen on each floor, equipped with a refrigerator and microwave. The reception desk is open 24 hours a day; photocopying and fax services are available from reception for a fee.

Residents are provided with a bedding pack (pillows, pillowcases, duvet, duvet cover, and sheets) at the start of the academic year at a fee. It is residents' own responsibility to launder their bed linen. The students' rooms are cleaned by housekeepers once a fortnight. Communal areas are cleaned every day.

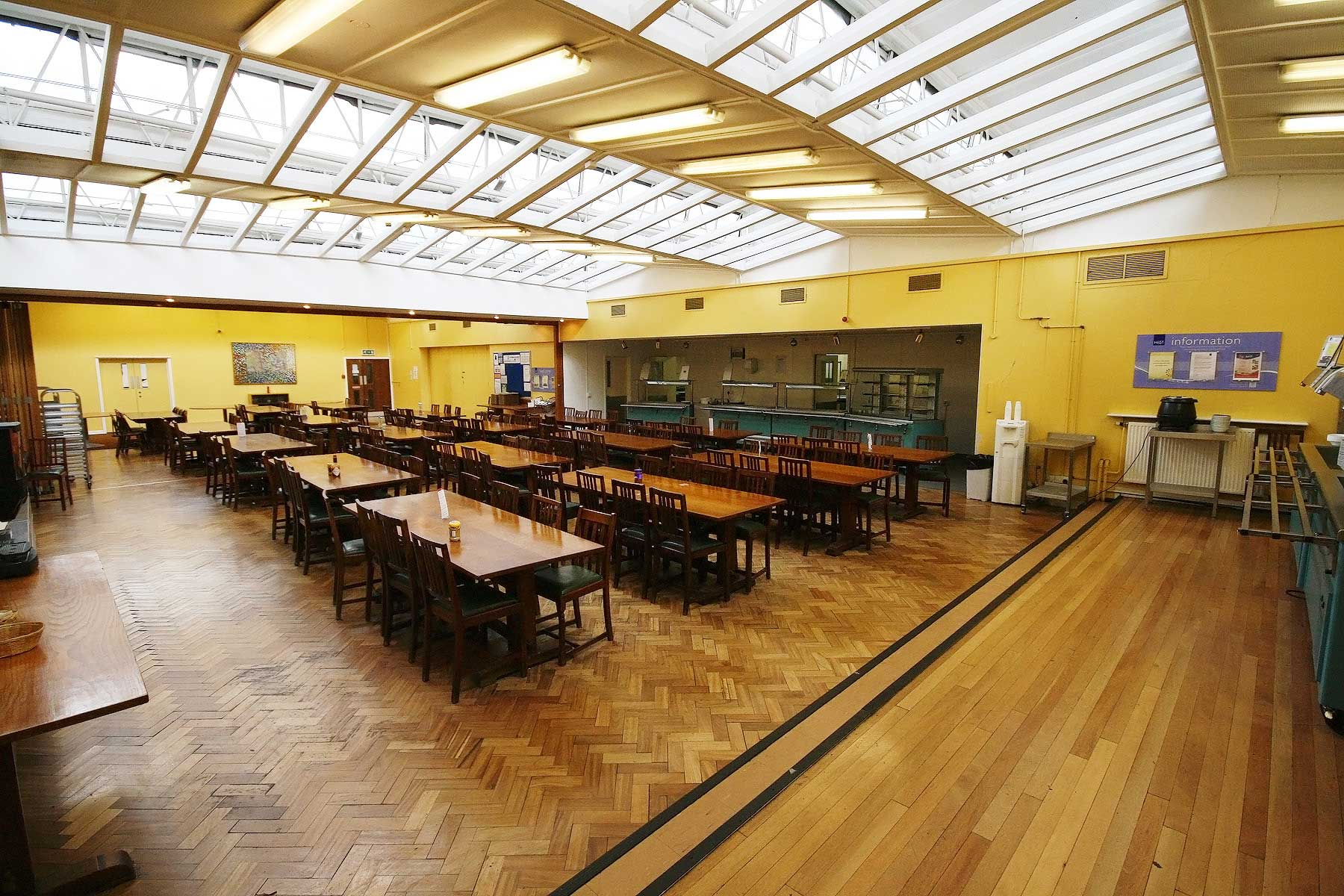
The dining hall

Connaught Hall is a fully catered hall of residence. Breakfast is served Monday-Friday, brunch on Saturdays and Sundays; dinner is served at 6 p.m. daily.

== Staff ==
Each of the intercollegiate halls of residence is managed by a Hall Manager. Every hall also has a Warden and a number of student Resident Advisors. The Hall Managers and their staff work full-time during office hours; whereas the Wardens and Resident Advisors are part-time staff and volunteers who are either studying or working in academic or academic-related roles elsewhere in the University of London.

=== Management staff ===
- Hall Manager
- Assistant manager

The Hall Manager has overall management responsibility for the Hall's buildings, furnishings, and finances, and is responsible for the provision of catering, maintenance, telephone, Internet, housekeeping, and reception services. They also look after the Hall's commercial activities, including conferences, bed & breakfast, and group bookings.

Accommodation matters (such as room allocations and waiting lists) are centralised at the Intercollegiate Halls Accommodation Bureau. The collection of accommodation fees is centralised to the finance office.

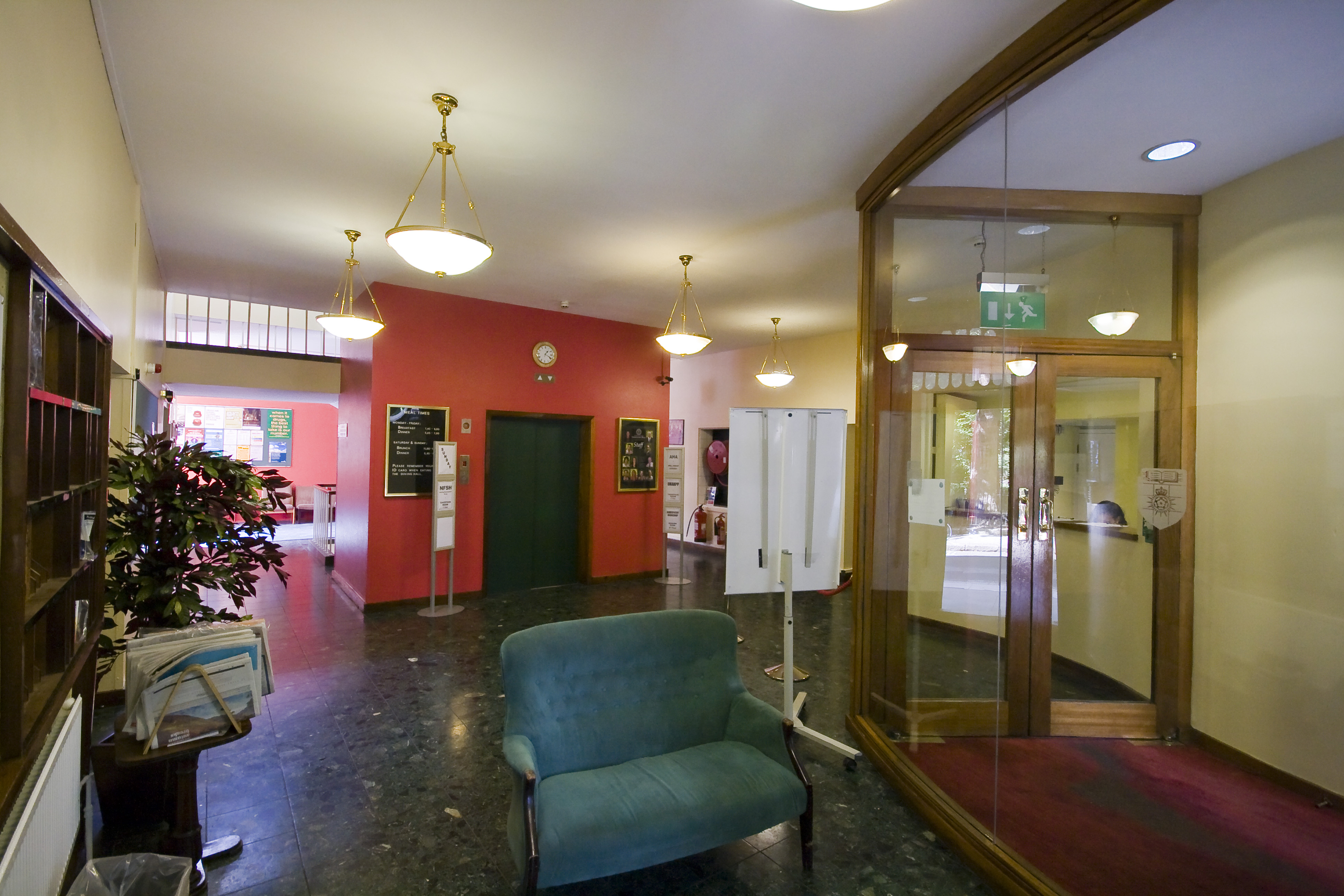
The reception lobby

=== Wardenial staff ===
- Warden
- Five student Resident Advisors (formerly Senior Members)

The Warden is a part-time member of staff resident within the Hall, responsible for welfare and pastoral care, discipline and conflict resolution, community and social life, the Residents' Club and Hall bar, out-of-hours emergencies, and student re-admissions. The Warden is usually a senior member of academic or academically related staff elsewhere within the University of London. The current Warden (since 2009) is Dr Adrian Clark, a specialist emergency physician within one of the university's teaching hospitals. Five student Resident Advisors – usually postgraduates or mature students – assist the Warden.

Students in Hall are often living away from home for the first time. They can encounter problems with loneliness, social isolation, bullying, conflicts related to religion or sexuality, depression, eating disorders, drug and alcohol abuse, self-harm and suicidal thoughts, as well as antisocial behaviour, noisy neighbours, theft, and damage to property. The Warden is available to offer front-line advice and support for students wrestling with problems such as these. The Warden also organises and oversees social events in the Hall and acts as a leader of the student community to help bind the resident population together.

The Warden (as Clerk to the Club & Senior Treasurer) supervises the elected Residents' Club Committee, which runs the Hall bar (which has been closed since the COVID-19 pandemic) and common rooms, and organises various social and sporting events throughout the year. The Warden is also a member of the Facilities Committee, which considers catering, security, housekeeping, health promotion, and general safety issues in Hall.

The Warden and Resident Advisors are all trained as fire marshals; most also have “first aid appointed person" training. There is a Duty Resident Advisor on call at nights and weekends to deal with any emergencies while the Bursar's Office is closed.

== Restructuring ==
The 1990s saw a decline in the number of university-employed staff in the Halls of residence, as contractors were engaged to provide most services such as cooking, cleaning, and maintenance. Since the early 2000s, the University of London has gradually centralised the management of the intercollegiate halls of residence. The number of Bursars has reduced from eight – one in every hall – to only two since 2010. In 2007, the contracts for all security, maintenance, catering, and housekeeping were taken away from individual hall Bursars to the management of a single contract manager based at Senate House (University of London).

Until July 2009, Connaught Hall had a Warden, a Vice-Warden (who was the Warden's deputy, served as the Senior Treasurer to the Residents' Club, and chaired the Facilities Committee), and four Senior Members. A costs and efficiency review of the student support structure in the intercollegiate halls lead to the abolition of the Vice-Warden post and an increase in the number of Senior Members. This was also the review that lead to accommodation matters being centralised to the Intercollegiate Halls Accommodation Bureau.

In May 2011, the University of London proposed to abolish all Warden and Vice-Warden posts across the intercollegiate halls of residence, leaving the Bursars in charge of student welfare, discipline, and social life in addition to their existing maintenance and administrative duties. An outcry from students in the Halls caused the proposal to be suspended, pending a further consultation due to commence in December 2011.

In the summer of 2012, the post of Bursar was abolished and another major restructuring of the management of the intercollegiate halls took place.

== Residents' Club Committee ==
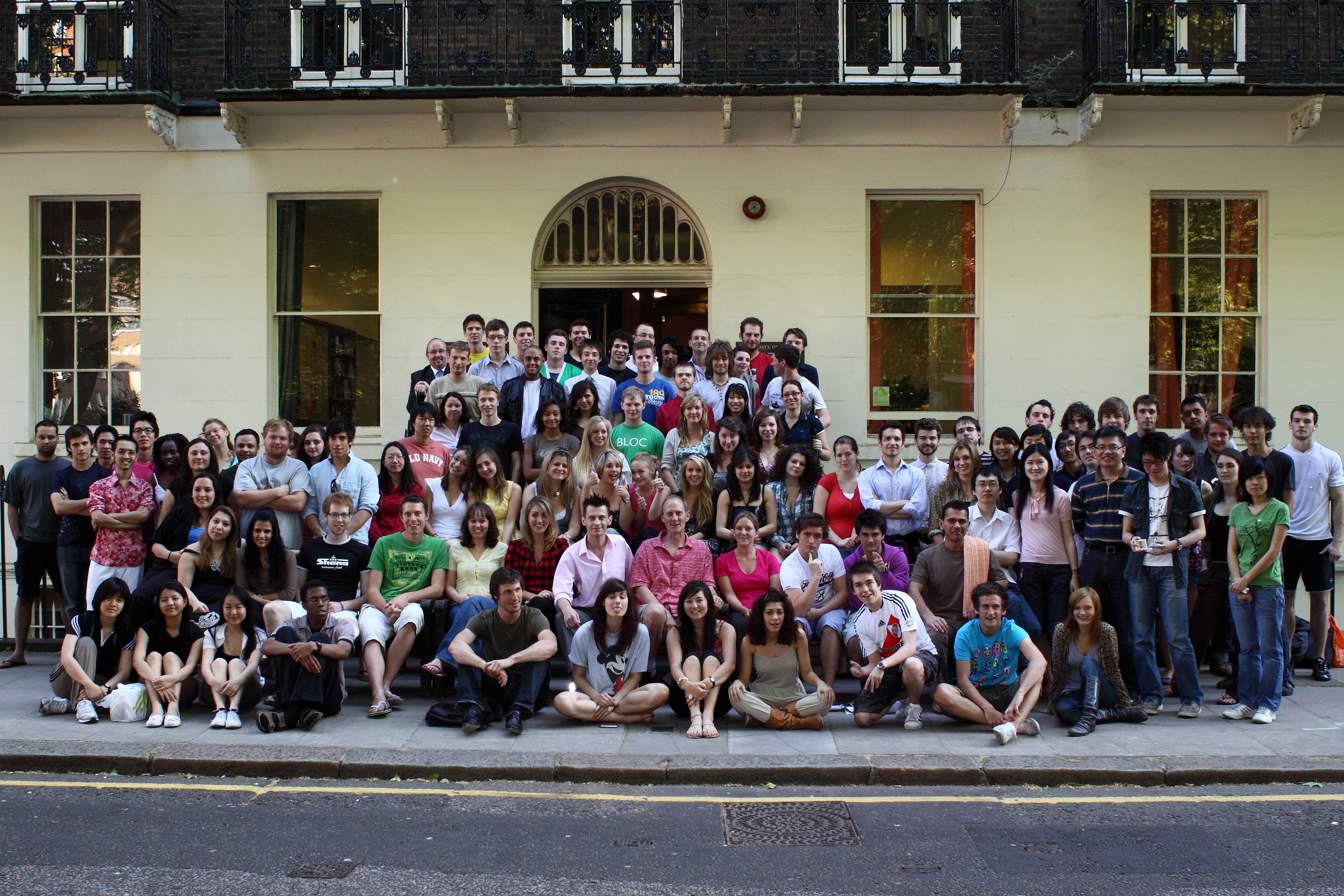
The student residents of Connaught Hall 2008-9

The Residents' Club Committee is made up of five elected Hall residents.

The Warden (as Clerk to the Club & Senior Treasurer) and appointed Bar Manager also sit on the committee.

The Residents' Club Committee is elected in October every year. Residents who want to stand for election need the support of two other residents to secure a nomination; after a short campaigning period, there a hustings is held in the Restaurant, where all the candidates are given five minutes to address the residents. Voting is by secret ballot immediately after the speeches. The Warden acts as Returning Officer, organising the elections and supervising the count, and then continues to oversee the committee's activities and financial management during the year.

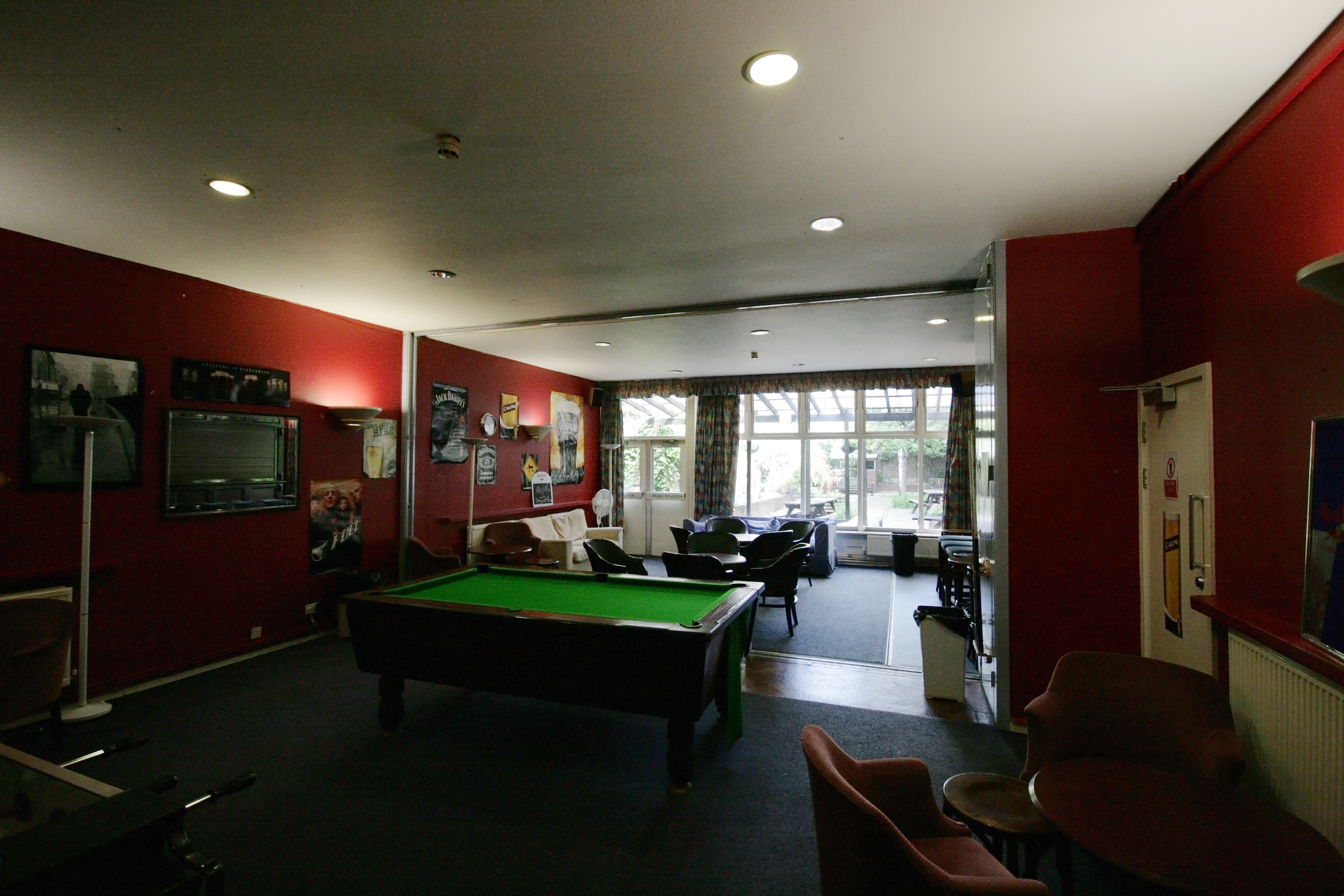
Connaught Hall bar

The Committee runs the Hall bar and organises various social and sporting functions during the year, funded by the subscriptions which all residents pay; this income is also used to provide newspapers and magazines for residents' use. The elected members of the committee can also help represent residents' concerns and suggestions to members of staff.

It has become traditional for the Residents' Club Committee to organise certain events every year:

- A welcome party in the bar at the beginning of the first term.
- A Hallowe'en party on 31 October (or sometimes a Guy Fawkes' party on 5 November).
- Decorating the Christmas tree, with mulled wine and mince pies for everyone who helps.
- A Christmas party, usually on the same night as the eagerly anticipated special Christmas Dinner in the Restaurant (usually with wine, crackers, live music, and carol singing).
- A Valentine's party.
- A "boat party": hiring a boat on the Thames for the main party of the Connaught Hall year.
- A summer "farewell" party.
- A group photograph of all the residents

Each Committee also finds its own special events or regular activities to organise; recent examples include football competitions, salsa classes, yoga, pool & table tennis tournaments, and coach trips to Paris and Amsterdam.

== See also ==
- College Hall, London
- International Hall, London

== Sources ==
- Connaught Hall Residents' Handbook 2008–9, University of London (downloadable from Connaught Hall web page)
- Connaught Hall Supplementary Regulations 2008–9, University of London (downloadable from Connaught Hall web page)
- University of London Intercollegiate Halls of Residence Licence Agreement 2008–9, University of London (downloadable from Connaught Hall web page)
