= Lansdowne Terrace, London =

Street in Bloomsbury, London

Coordinates: 51.5235°N 0.1210°W

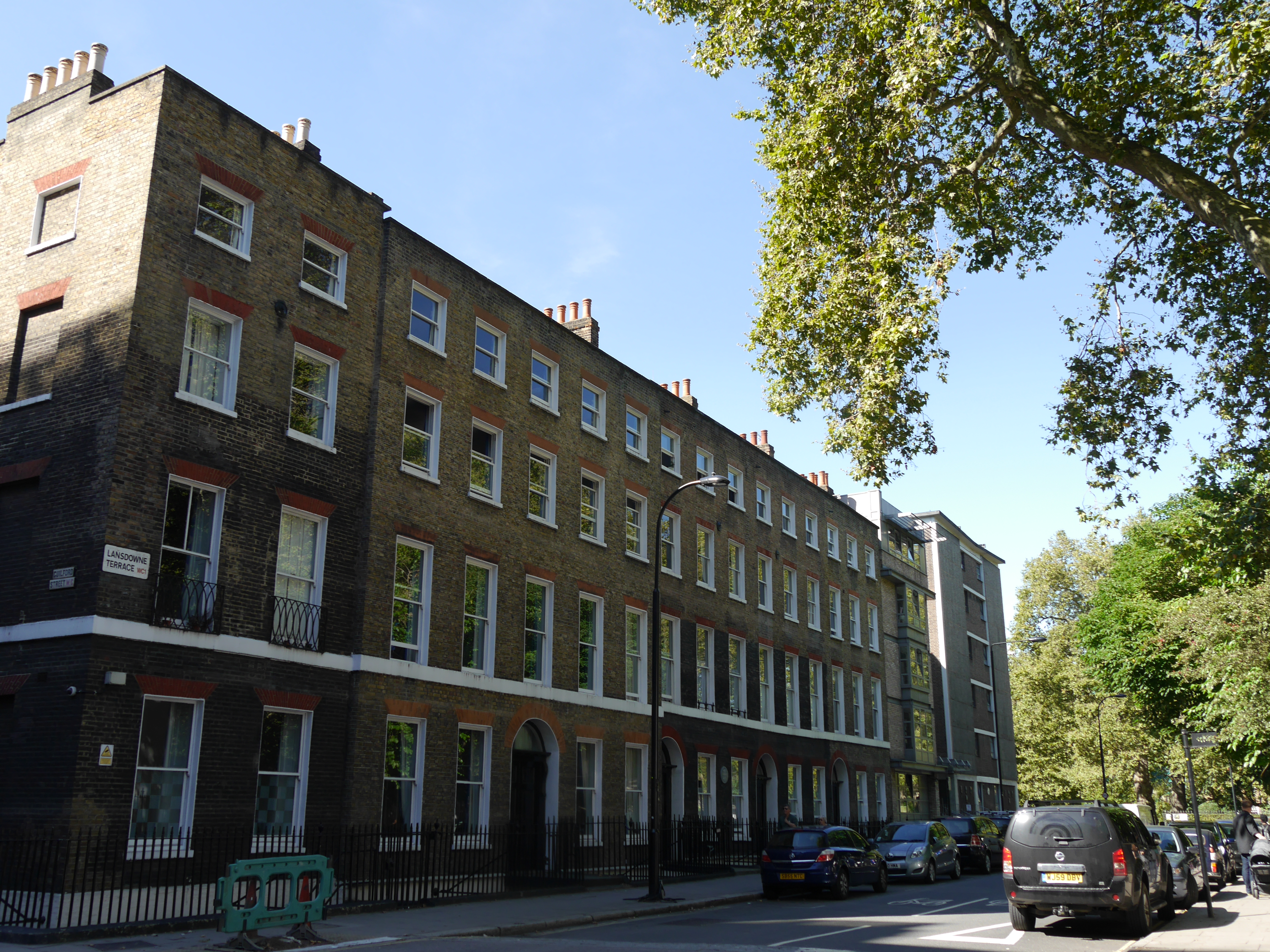
Lansdowne Terrace, London, 2016

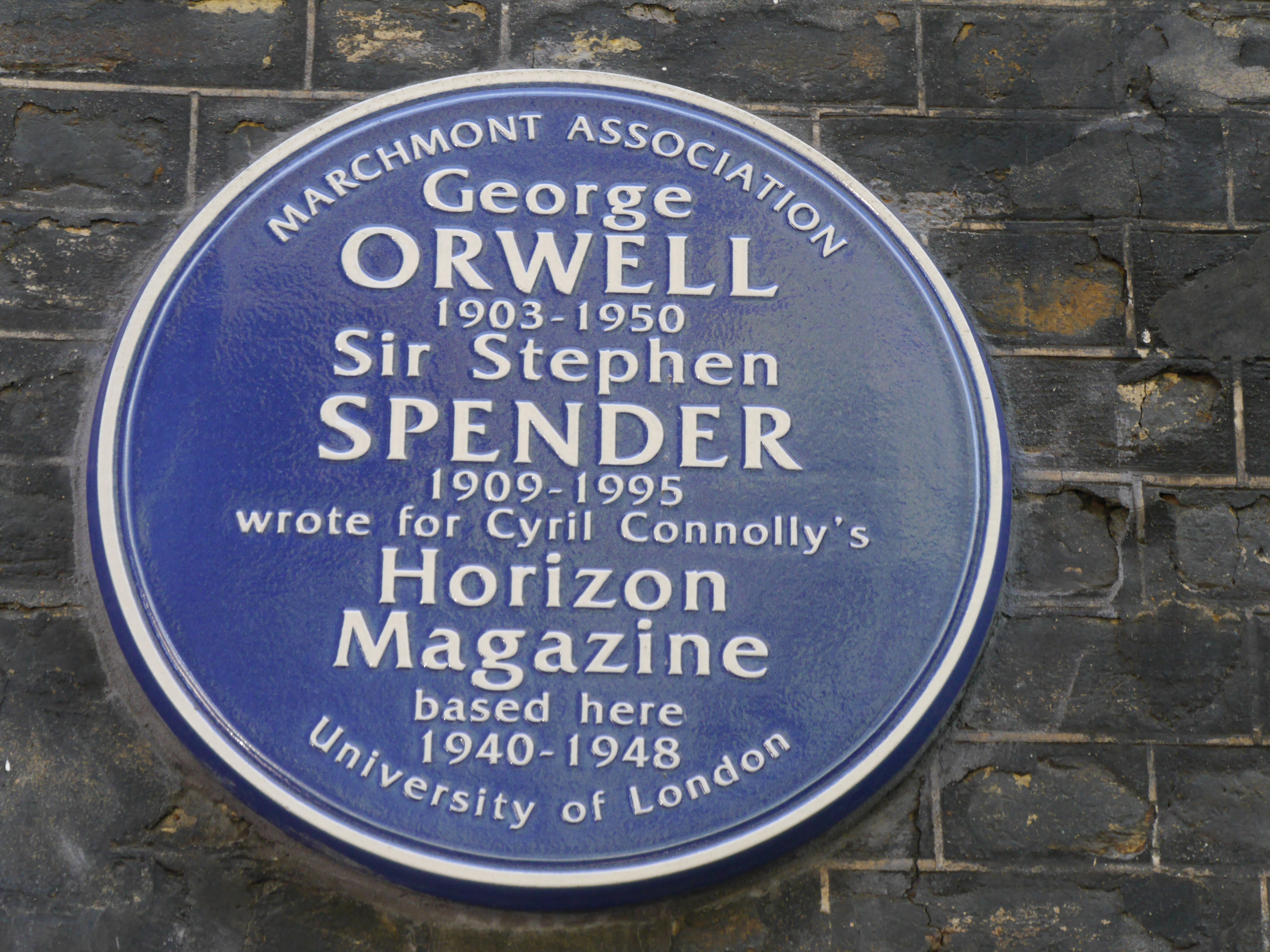
Horizon plaque, Lansdowne Terrace

Lansdowne Terrace is a street in Bloomsbury, London WC1.

It runs south to north from Guilford Street to Brunswick Square, with houses on the west side and Coram's Fields on the east side.

Nos 1 to 4 are Grade II listed houses, built in 1794, and designed by James Burton.

The main entrance to International Hall, a hall of residence owned by the University of London is at the northern end.

Horizon: A Review of Literature and Art, edited by Cyril Connolly, was based there throughout its existence in the 1940s.
