= Eleanor Grove =

British translator and educationist (1826–1905)

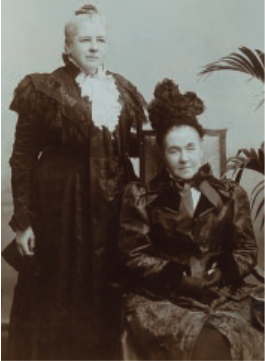
- Rosa Morison and Eleanor Grove (seated)
- Born: 1826; Clapham, England
- Died: 22 November 1905 (aged 78–79); Tavistock Place, England
- Partner: Rosa Morison

Eleanor Grove (1826 – 22 November 1905) was a British translator and educationist. She was the founding principal of College Hall in London that allowed women to live in Bloomsbury and attend the University of London. She and her lifelong partner, Rosa Morison, have a building named after them.

== Life ==
Grove was born in Clapham in 1826, one of many siblings. Her parents were Mary Blades and Thomas Grove, a dealer in fish and venison and a congregationalist. They left her well provided for, and she was able to decide how she would spend her life. She worked as a governess in Germany and in Austria, and she translated two novels: An Egyptian Princess by Georg Ebers and Wilhelm Meister's Apprenticeship by Johann Wolfgang von Goethe.

When Queen's College, London, advertised for an assistant secretary, Grove was so qualified that she was given the job despite missing the interview. Her brother, George Grove, the engineer and musicologist, had told her of the position, and he attended the interview on her behalf. It was there that she met the linguist Rosa Morison who had been employed as assistant secretary in 1872. Grove was promoted to Lady Resident. She oversaw the staff, guided the students, and, where necessary, imposed discipline.

Grove and Morison loved the German language, and they had similar views on the education of women. In 1881 they lost confidence in the management of Queen's College, which they considered lax and inefficient. Moreover, the college was failing to rise to the opportunity raised by the aspiring ambitions for women's education at the University of London. The pair left their jobs and set out on a brief holiday travelling in Germany together. On their return, they approached the University of London with an offer to work for nothing. Morison became Vice-Principal at the university's newly opened College Hall and Grove was appointed Principal. Eleanor was able to use her connections to find a building for the college (and the two of them) at 1 Byng Place, Torrington Square. College Hall opened at the former Coward College in 1882, initially with rooms for nine students; by 1884 there were seventeen students as other buildings were added.

Morison was promoted in 1883 to the new post of "Lady Superintendent of Women Students".

== Death and legacy ==
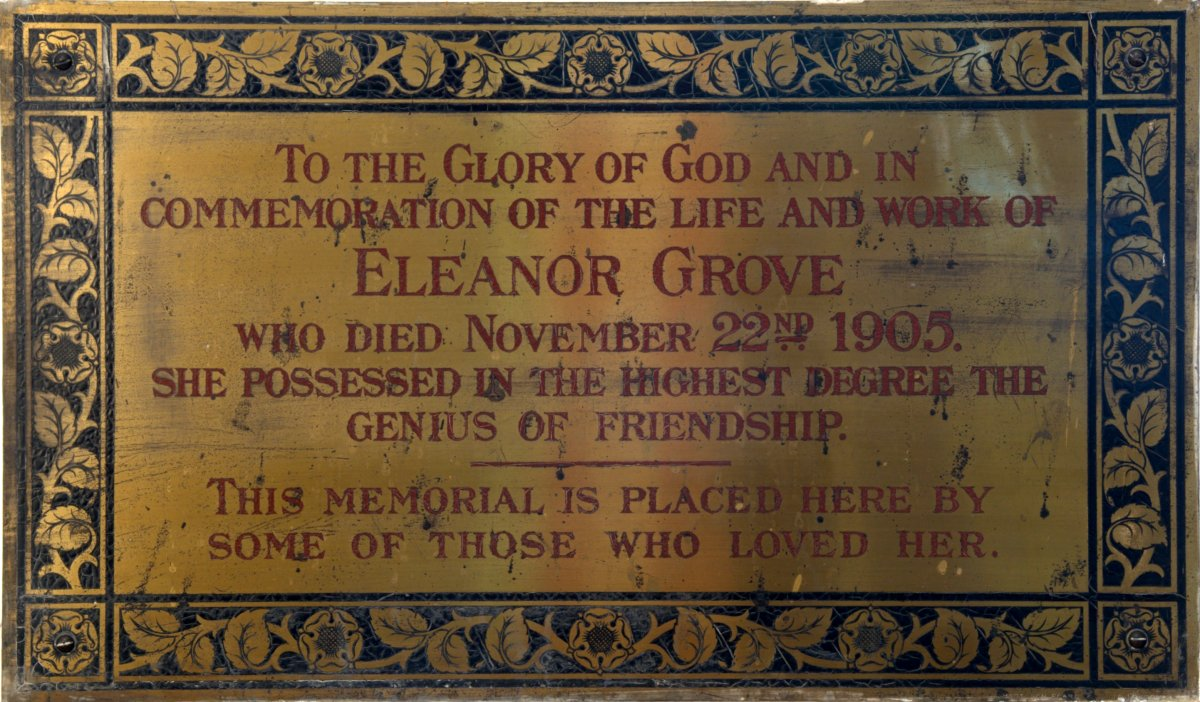
Commemorative plaque

Grove's poor health obliged her to retire in 1890 to a nearby house at 15 Tavistock Place, where she died of heart failure in 1905. After a service at St Pancras, she was buried in the family vault at West Norwood Cemetery.

University College, London, grants an annual scholarship in her name. In 2018 a new hall of residence was named Eleanor Rosa Hall to commemorate the contribution of Rosa Morison and Eleanor Grove to women's education. The new building has 33 floors and capacity for 500 students. The interior design is inspired by its namesakes.
