= Rosa Morison =

British linguist and educationist

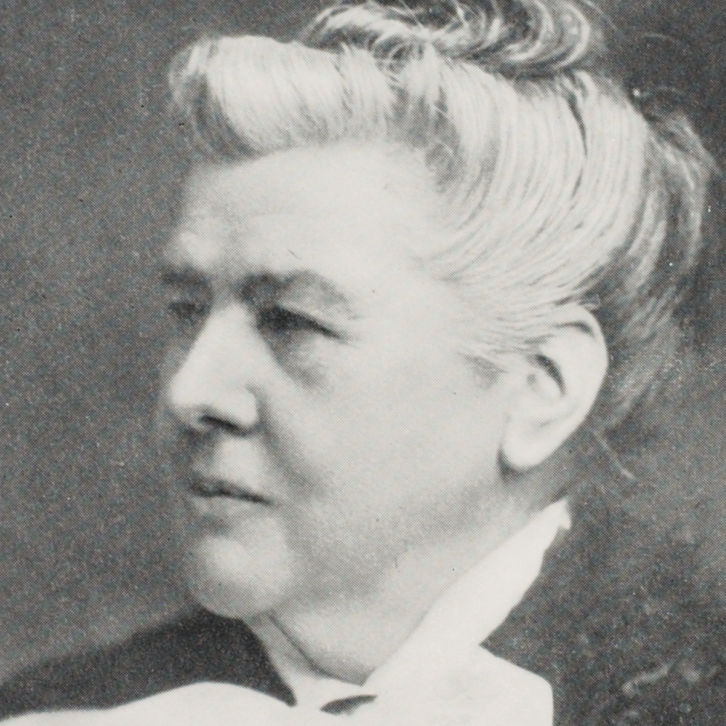
- Photo from her obituary
- Born: 5 June 1841; Hammersmith, England
- Died: 8 February 1912 (aged 70); University College London, England
- Education: Queen's College, Harley Street
- Occupation: Educationist
- Partner: Eleanor Grove

Rosa Morison (5 June 1841 – 8 February 1912) was a British linguist and educationist. She offered her services for free to College Hall, London, and became their first Lady Superintendent of Women Students. She worked there until her death, outliving her lifelong partner, Eleanor Grove. The University of London named a hall of residence after the two of them in 2012.

== Life ==
Morison was born in Hammersmith in 1841. She was the fifth child of Catherine Agutter and William Morison. Her father was a baker. She had a good education completing in Queen's College, where she was soon employed as a linguist in 1866. She could teach Italian, Latin, and German. It was there that she met Eleanor Grove, who was employed as assistant secretary in 1872. Grove was so qualified that she was given the job despite missing the interview and sending her brother to speak on her behalf. She was later promoted to Lady Resident.

She and Eleanor loved the language of German, and they had similar views on education. In 1881 they lost confidence in the college's management, which they considered lax and inefficient. Moreover, the school was failing to rise to the opportunity raised by the ambitions of women's education at the University of London.

They went on a brief holiday to Germany together, and on her return, Rosa approached the University of London, offering to work for nothing. She became Vice-Principal at their newly opened College Hall and Eleanor was appointed Principal. Eleanor was able to use her connections to find a house for the college (and the two of them) in Byng Place. College Hall opened at No. 1 Byng Place in 1882, initially with rooms for nine students; by 1884, there were 17 students as other buildings were added.

Morison was promoted in 1883 to the new post of "Lady Superintendent of Women Students". The women students included not only those at University College but also the students at Elizabeth Garrett Anderson's London School of Medicine for Women.

Eleanor's poor health obliged her to retire in 1890 to a house at 15 Tavistock Place, and she died of heart failure there in 1905.

== Death and legacy ==
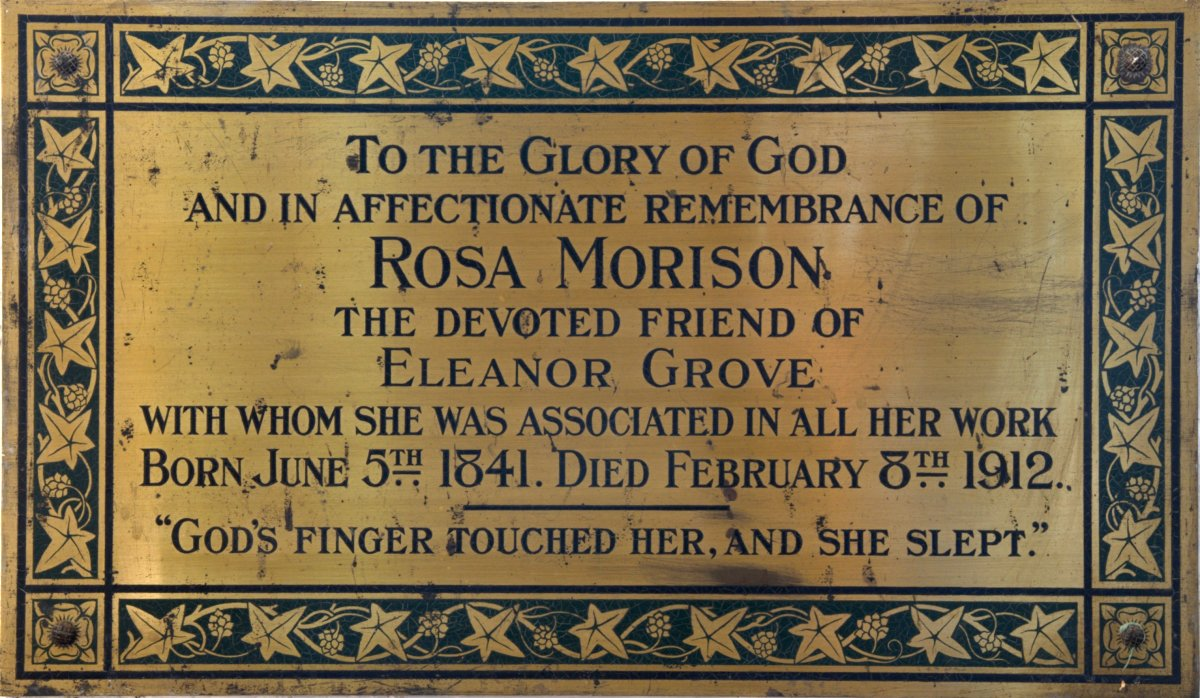
Commemorative plaque

Morison died in University College London in 1912. Her funeral was very well attended, and her bequest was used to establish a scholarship at the college. In 2018 a new hall of residence was named Eleanor Rosa House to commemorate the contribution of Rosa Morison and Eleanor Grove to women's education. The building has 33 floors and capacity for 500 students. The interior design is inspired by Rosa and Eleanor.
