= Governesses' Benevolent Institution =

Governesses' Benevolent Institution (GBI) was a British charity organization, founded in 1841. It was the first association for governesses in Great Britain. It was dissolved in 2017.

== History ==
Throughout the 1800s, the profession of governess was one of few professions open to educated women of the upper or middle-class who wished or needed to support themselves. This was mainly due to their lack of legal rights, and the concept of having a "separate sphere" from men.

Depiction of a governess

Governess had become a very common profession since the second half of the 18th century. In fact, a 1851 census accounted for over 20,000 women who identified themselves as a governess (though there were likely more, as the role often overlapped with other domestic work and women were often overlooked in censuses.) A governess's main role was to provide in-home education for children.

While the role of governess has been romanticized over time through popular literature like Charlotte Brontë’s Jane Eyre, it was a hard job. It was isolating; the employed ate with the children and often lived in-home.The working conditions were not regulated. There was no education for governesses, salaries were low, and many governesses became destitute when they were no longer able to work. There was also competition in the position, and often the governesses with the most abilities were turned down for less skilled but cheaper governesses.There was a need for an association to address the rights of governesses.

Philanthropic institutions were very popular in this time period for helping the struggling middle-class. The Governesses' Benevolent Institution (GBI) was founded at a meeting chaired by the Duke of Cambridge. The institution had over 600 subscribers in nine months, but remained largely stagnant until a new secretary took action. Rev. David Lating became secretary in 1843, establishing a ladies' committee to oversee the Institution.

The Governesses' Benevolent Institution worked to give stability to women in the governess profession. They founded an education program to train governesses, which was an inspiration for future women colleges. Lodging for governesses in between employment was started in the GBI's Governess Home. A register was created for governesses. There was also a fund set up for governesses in need of financial assistance.

The main focus of the Institution was a retirement home for old governesses – Asylum for Aged Governesses. This was very popular for governesses over 50 who were unable to work.

In the early 20th century, the profession of governess experienced a rapid decline due to the introduction of a regulated public school system. The Governesses' Benevolent Institution therefore changed its name and function to address female teachers in general. The association managed retirement homes for teachers until the early 21st century. It was dissolved in 2017.

== Associated Institutions ==
The Governesses' Benevolent Institution was associated with the Queen's College, London, founded in 1848, and later with the Bedford College, founded in 1849.
