= International Hall, London =

University student residence in England

Coordinates: 51.5237°N 0.1211°W

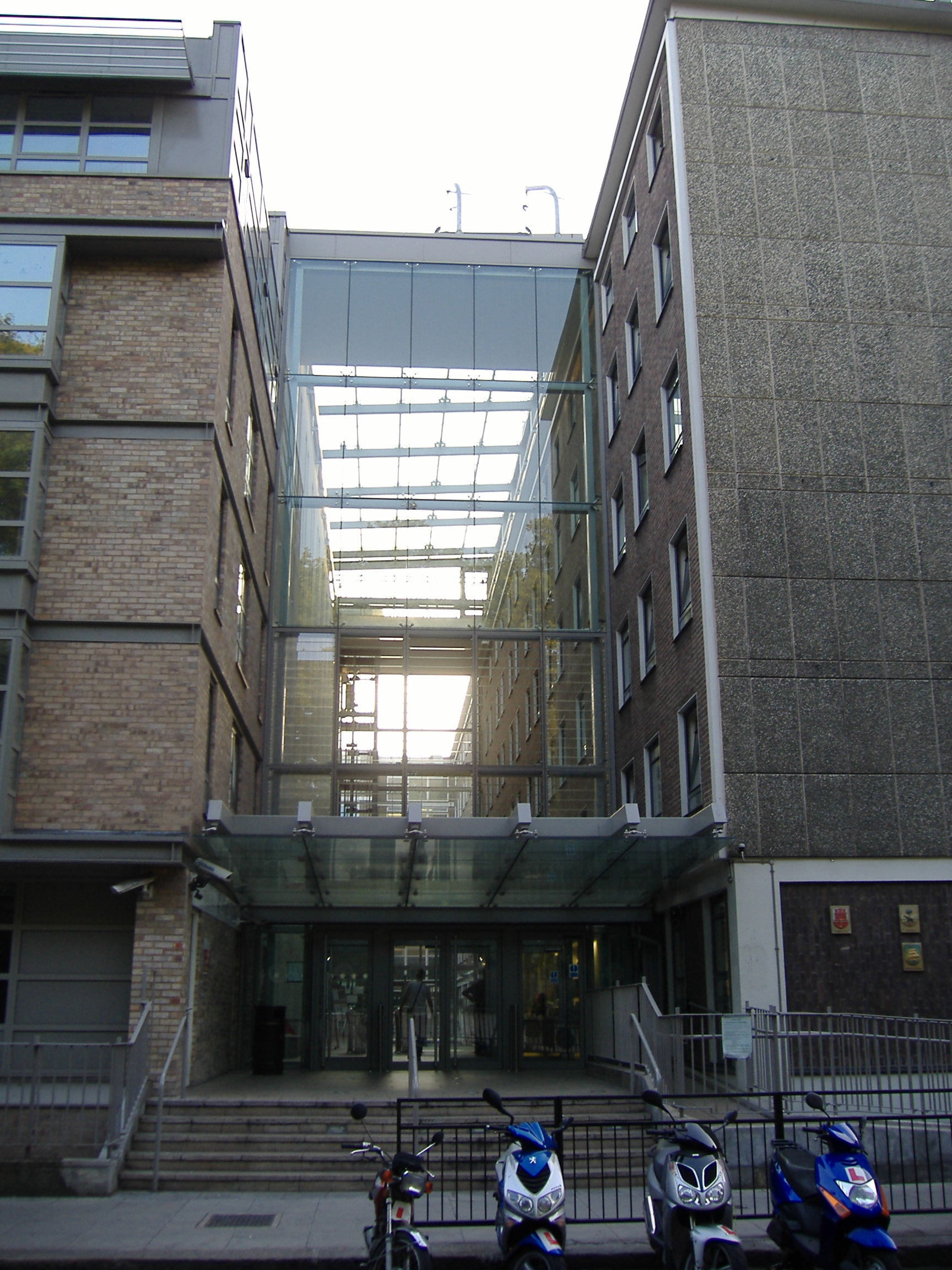
Main door of International Hall, Lansdowne Terrace, London, WC1N 1AS

International Hall is a Hall of Residence owned by the University of London and situated on Brunswick Square and Lansdowne Terrace in the Bloomsbury district of London. It is an intercollegiate hall, and as such provides accommodation for full-time students at institutions such as University College, King's College, Queen Mary, the School of Oriental and African Studies, the London School of Economics, and other such constituent colleges of the University of London. It is the largest single hall of the University of London.

== History ==
The first wing (now known as the North Wing, and previously as the Main Wing) was opened in 1963 by the Indian High Commissioner. The second part of the hall (now known as the West Wing) was opened in 1968 by the then Chancellor of the University of London, HM Queen Elizabeth, the Queen Mother.

Later construction included the conversion of Georgian terrace houses on Lansdowne Terrace into flats for postgraduate students, the conversion of similar properties on Guilford Street into two new sets of single and double study-bedrooms (known as House and Ingold), and the construction of X block (pronounced "cross-block", although room numbers there, e.g. X123, were pronounced "ex-one-two...") connecting Ingold and the West Wing.

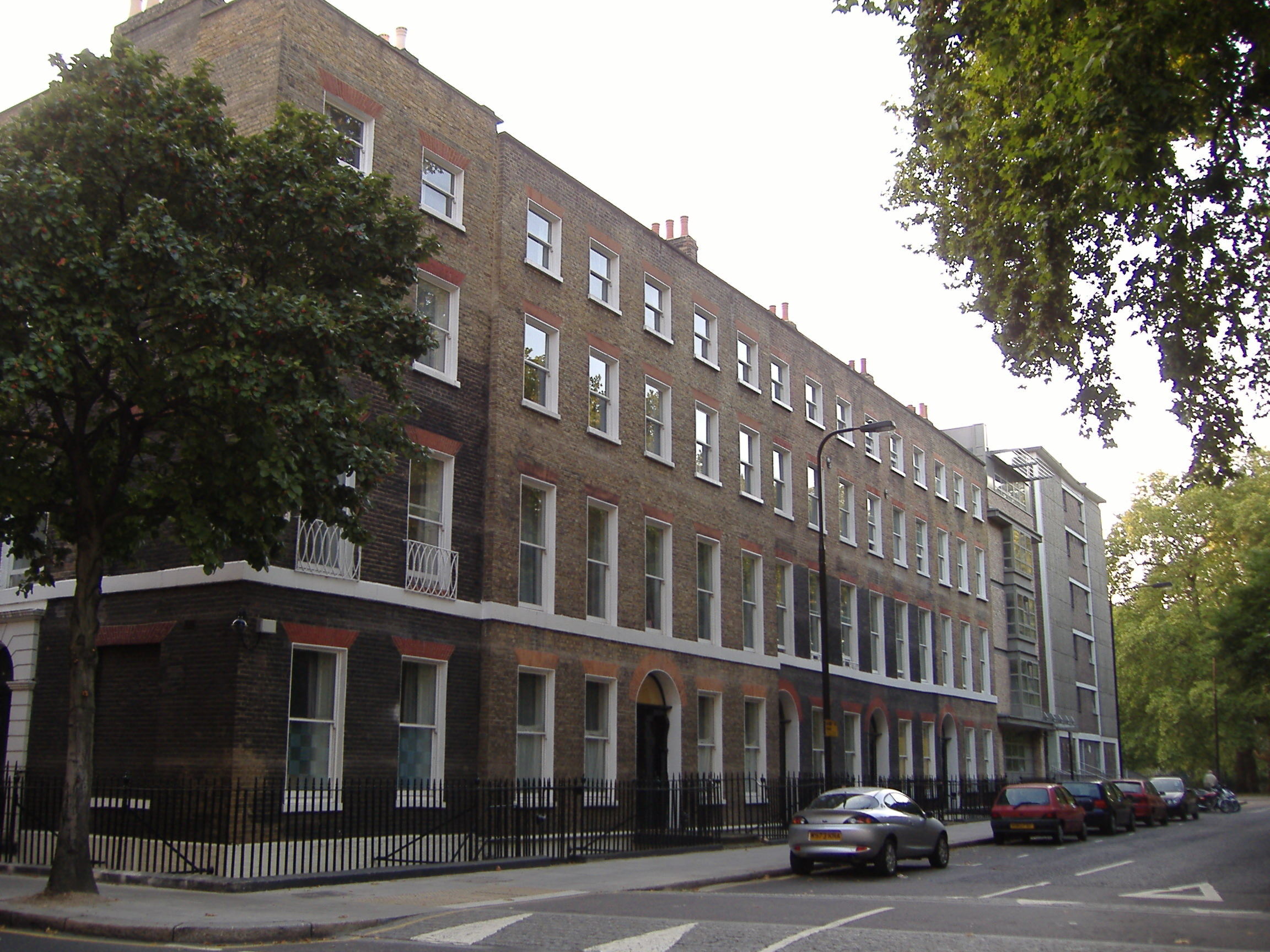
The Lansdowne Flats on Guilford Street.

The Hall underwent a major refurbishment in 2002-03. The refurbishment saw the demolition of the X block and the construction of a new Central Wing comprising studio flats for postgraduate students. The refurbishment also saw the construction of a new entrance on Lansdowne Terrace (the previous main entrance having been on Brunswick Square), and refurbishment of all facilities and rooms. The Georgian Terrace houses on Lansdowne Terrace and Guilford Street were also refurbished as large family flats. The newly refurbished Hall was reopened in December 2003 by the Chancellor of the University of London, the Princess Royal.

== Student population ==
For over 40 years, International Hall has accommodated a range of students from all over the world, although the majority have been British. Now one of eight University of London intercollegiate halls of residence, International Hall accommodates a maximum of 850 University of London students, partners and children. There is an even mix of men and women, and a diverse range of cultural and social backgrounds.

== Accommodation and facilities ==
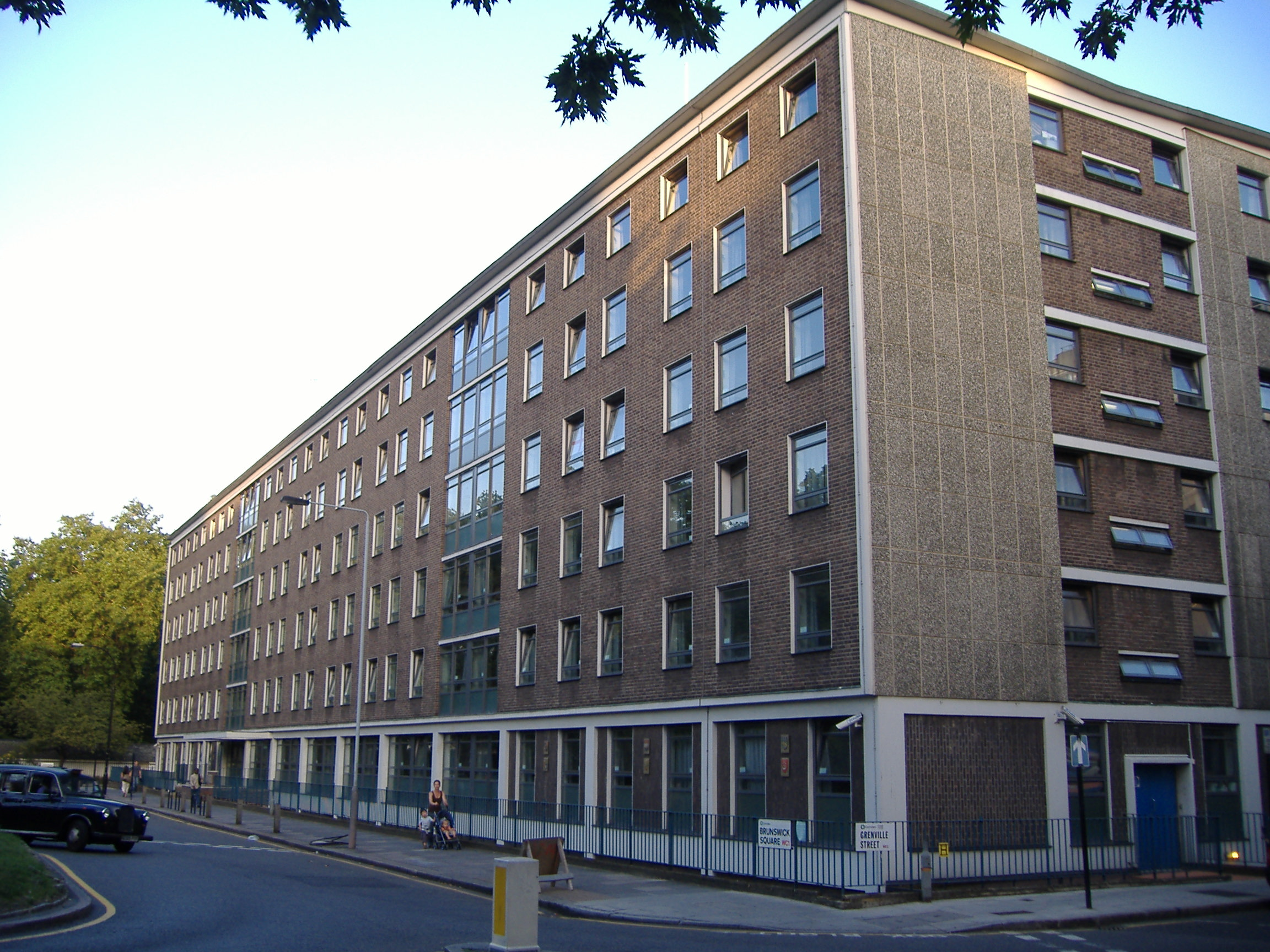
The North Wing (formerly the Main Wing) facing Brunswick Square.

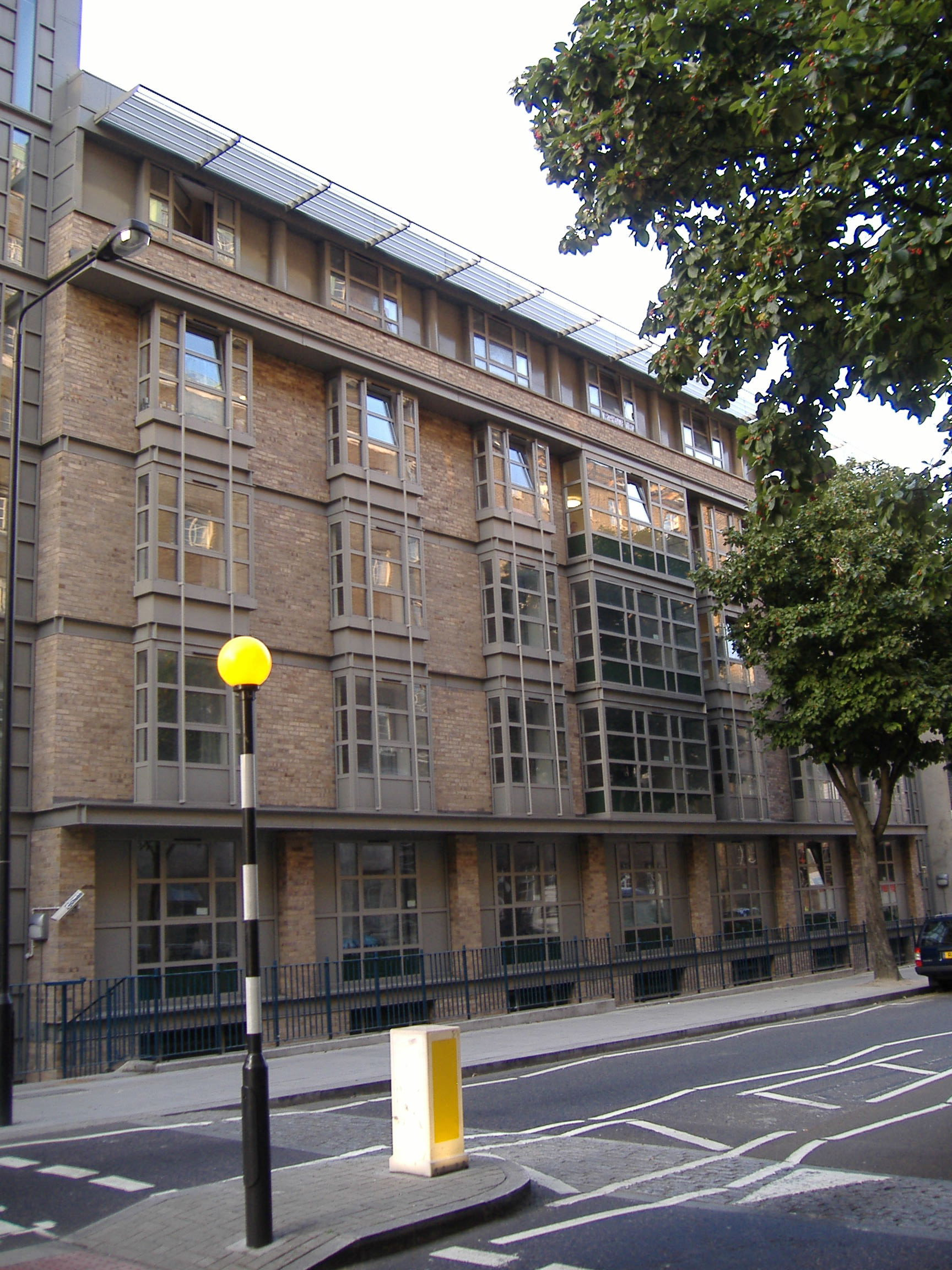
The New Central Wing facing onto Guilford Street.

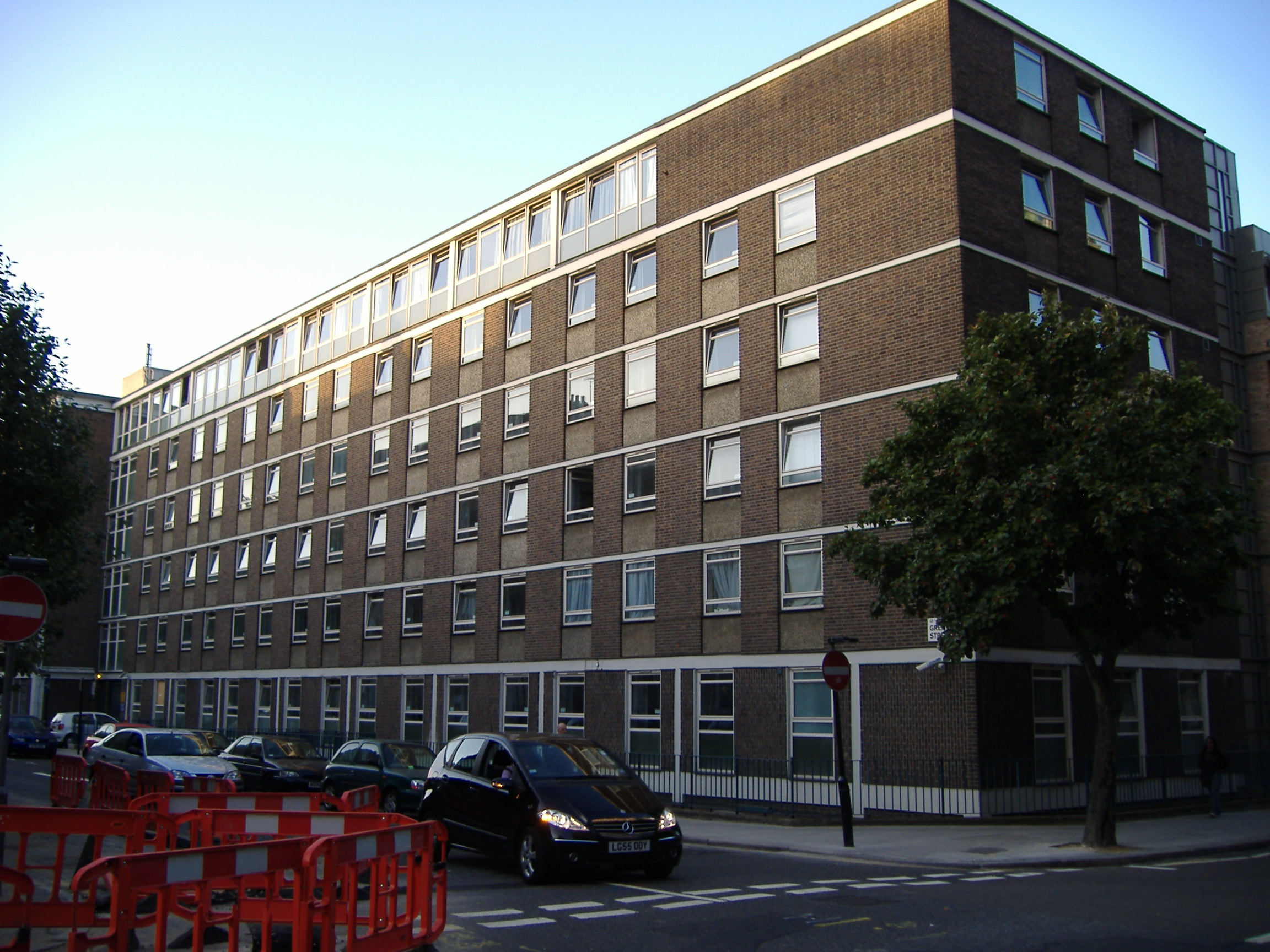
The West Wing taken from Guilford Street.

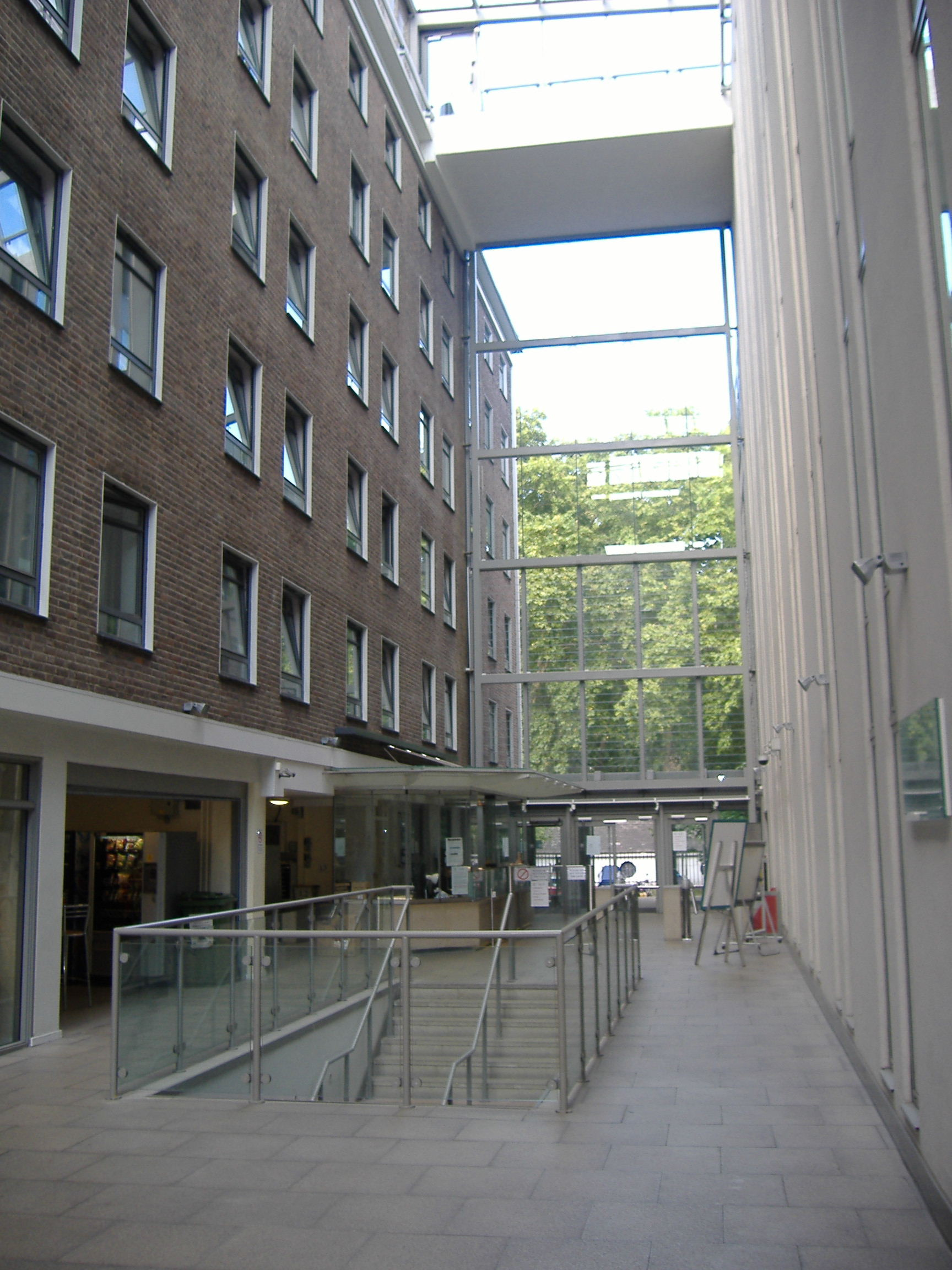
Inside the atrium looking towards reception and the main doors that lead out onto Lansdowne Terrace.

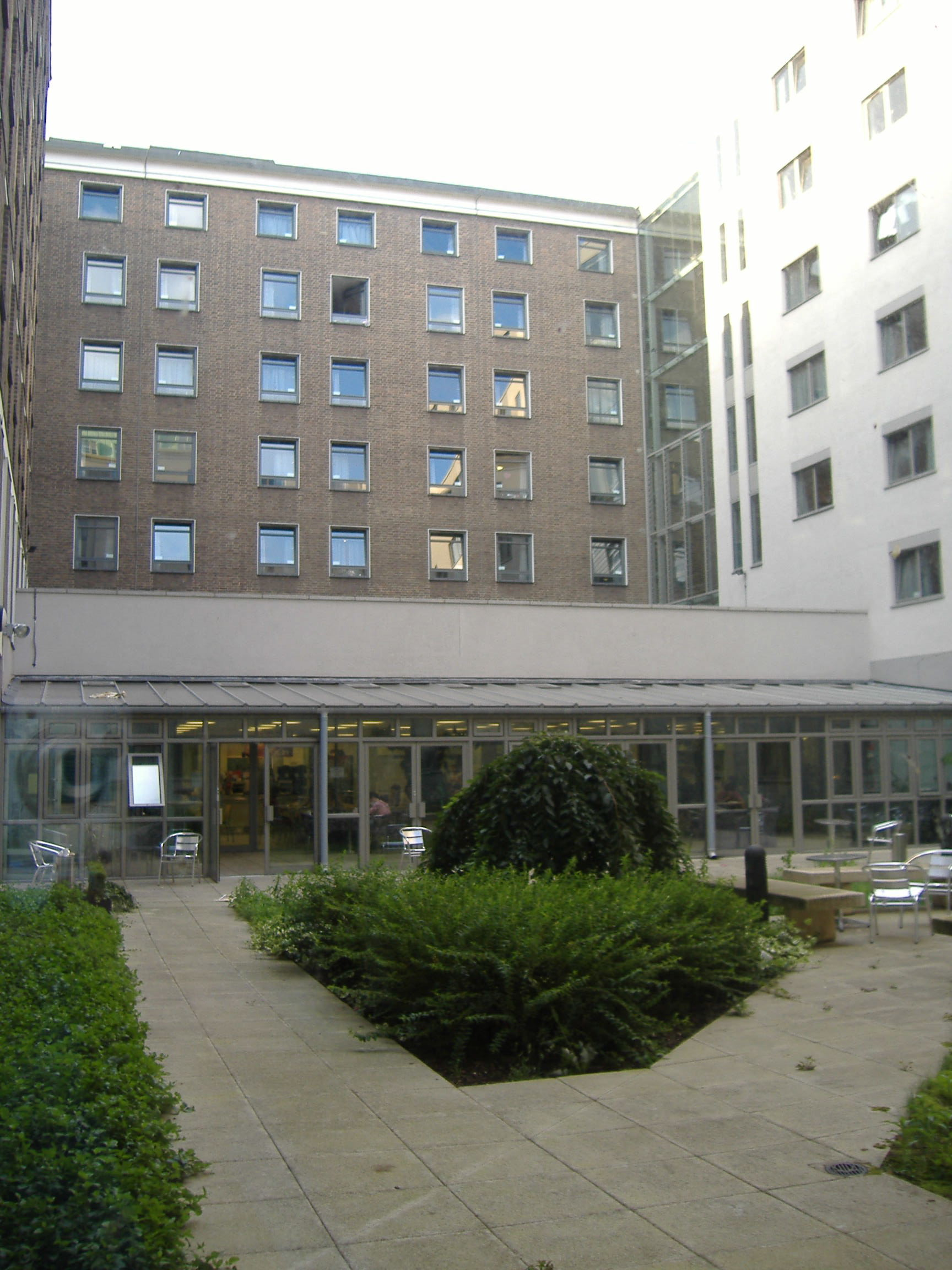
The courtyard by the common room and conservatory.

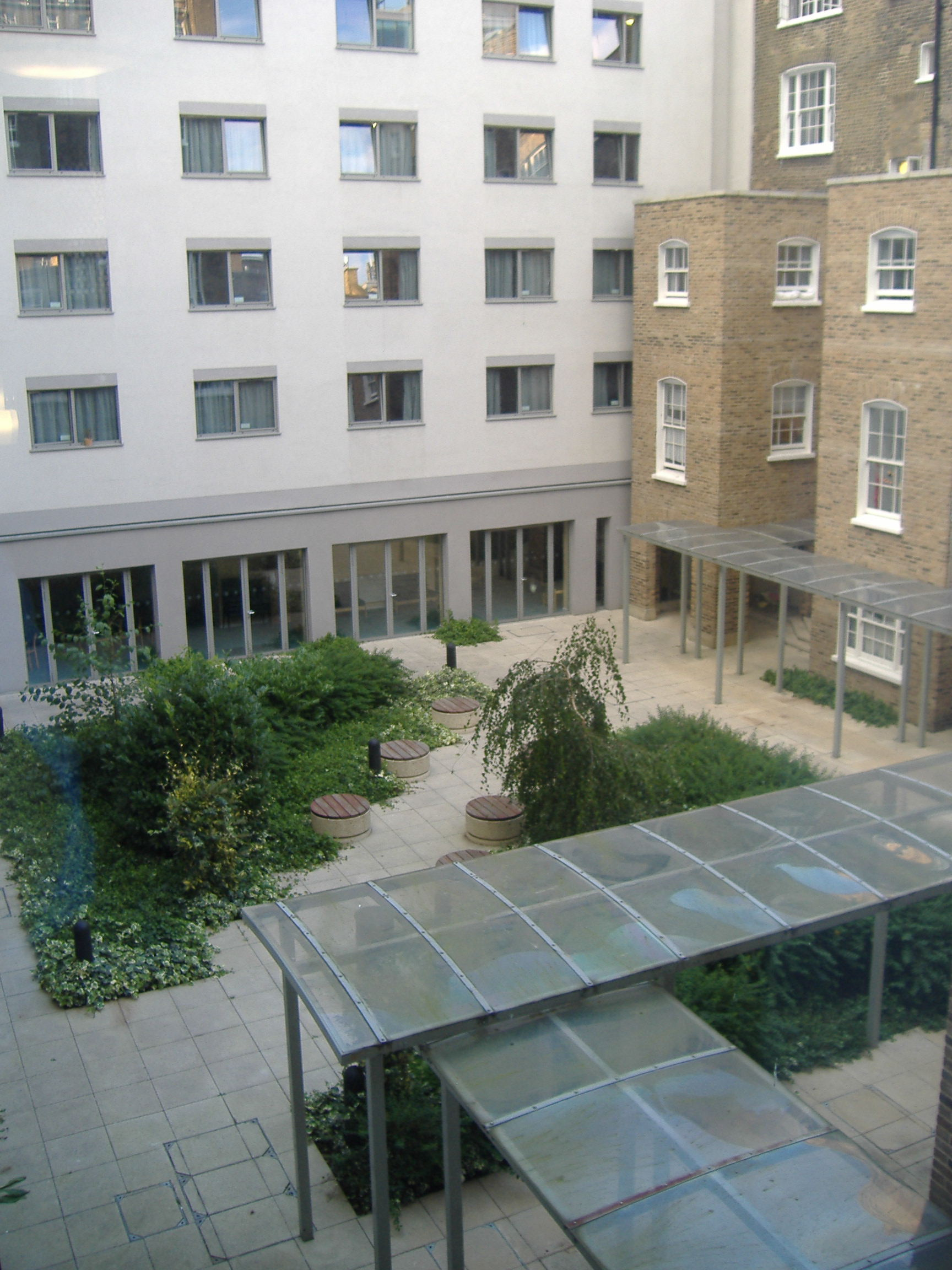
The second of the two courtyards created by the construction of the Central Wing. This one is overlooked by the Central Wing and the Lansdowne Terrace Flats.

The Hall comprises three types of accommodation: single study-bedrooms which are the most common; studios, which are available to postgraduates only; and large family-style flats in the Georgian Terrace housing. Rooms are also available for students with disabilities. For single study bedrooms, every room has a washbasin, but toilet and shower facilities are all shared. The studio flats and Georgian Terrace flats have private bathrooms. Every room has an internet connection.

The Hall offers a range of facilities including: two study rooms; a computer/internet room; an activity room; a television room with Sky Freesat; a cinema; a TV room; a self-service restaurant; a coin-operated laundrette; a secure bike store; a squash court; two music rooms; two courtyard gardens; several common areas containing pool tables, ping pong, computer games and TV. There are numerous vending machines for soft drinks and snacks, and small pantries/kitchens on each floor of the North and West Wings, each equipped with a refrigerator and microwave. The Studio Flats and Georgian Terrace flats contain their own cooking facilities. The reception desk is open 24 hours a day; photocopying and fax services are available from reception.

For a large number of residents (mainly those in the single study bedrooms), International Hall is a fully catered hall of residence. Residents in the studio or Georgian Terrace flats are welcome to eat in the dining hall but must buy their meals. Breakfast is served daily between 8.00am-9.30am (11.00am-12.30pm on weekends). Dinner is served at 6.00pm-7.30pm daily.

== Staff ==
The staff of the Intercollegiate Halls of Residence are divided into two groups: the management team, and the wardenial team. The two teams always work closely together, but have different sets of responsibilities. The management work full-time during office hours, whereas the wardenial staff are part-time members of staff who are either studying or working elsewhere in the University of London.

=== Hall Manager's Team ===
- Hall Manager
- Assistant Hall Manager

The Hall Manager has overall management responsibility for the Hall’s buildings, furnishings, and finances. The Hall Manager and their staff are responsible for the provision of catering, maintenance, telephone, Internet, housekeeping, and reception services. They also look after the Hall’s commercial activities, including conferences, bed & breakfast, and group bookings.

=== Wardenial Team ===
- Warden
- Seven Senior Members (Sub-Wardens)

The Warden and Senior Members are part-time members of staff resident within the Hall, responsible for student welfare and pastoral care, discipline, re-admissions, Hall community and social life, and out-of-hours emergency cover.

The Wardenial team are all experienced academics, teachers, or postgraduate students within the University of London. They are available to offer support and guidance to students, and can help with problems both inside and outside the Hall, including academic difficulties, medical or emotional problems, social concerns, financial worries, and problems with the behaviour of other residents (e.g. noisy neighbours).

The Warden and Senior Members oversee the elected residents’ Club Committee, which organises various social and sporting events throughout the year.

The Wardenial team all trained as fire marshals, and have first aid training. They participate in an on-call Duty Officer rota covering nights and weekends to deal with any emergencies while the Hall Manager's Office is closed. They can be contacted via reception at any time.

== Residents' Club Committee ==
The Residents Club Committee is made up 10 elected student residents. The process is based on self nomination, and then election via a first past the post popular vote. Hustings take place the evening before the vote and results are normally released the following afternoon.

The Residents' Club Committee is elected in January of each academic year.

The Committee organises various social and sporting functions during the year, funded by subscriptions which all residents pay; this income is also used to provide newspapers and magazines for residents' use. The elected members of the Committee can also help represent residents' concerns and suggestions to members of staff.

It has become traditional for the Residents' Club Committee to organise certain events every year:

- A welcome party in the common room at the beginning of the first term.
- A Halloween party on 31 October (or sometimes a Guy Fawkes' party on 5 November).
- Decorating the Christmas tree, usually with mulled wine and mince pies for everyone who helps.
- A Christmas party, usually on the same night as the eagerly anticipated special Christmas Dinner in the Restaurant (usually with wine, crackers, live music, and carol singing).
- A Valentine's party.
- A "boat party": hiring a boat on the Thames for the main party of the International Hall year.
- A summer "farewell" party.

Each Committee also finds its own special events or regular activities to organise; recent examples include football competitions, salsa classes, yoga, and pool & table tennis tournaments.

== See also ==
- Connaught Hall, London
- College Hall, London
- International Students House, London
