= College Hall, London =

Residence hall in University of London

Coordinates: 51.5221°N 0.1314°W

College Hall is a fully catered hall of residence of the University of London. It is situated on Malet Street in the Bloomsbury district of central London. It is an intercollegiate hall, and as such provides accommodation for full-time students at constituent colleges and institutions of the University, including King's College, University College, Queen Mary, the London School of Economics and the School of Oriental and African Studies amongst others.

== History ==
The hall was established in 1882 in Byng Place to cater for female students, primarily at UCL and the London School of Medicine for Women. It was co-founded by educationalist and suffragist Annie Leigh Browne, Mary Stewart Kilgour, Mary Browne (Lady Lockyer) and Henrietta Müller. The first Principal was Eleanor Grove, who arranged for lease of the house in Byng Place, assisted by Rosa Morison; the pair volunteered to take the posts with no salary.

The hall was incorporated in 1886 as College Hall London, and was recognised as a hall of residence by the University of London in 1910. It moved to nearby Malet Street in 1932. The hall was used as a club for overseas armed forces during World War II, under lease to the Victoria League, and was heavily damaged by bombing in April 1941. The corporation of the hall was wound up in 1965, with control passing to the University of London.

== Structure ==
Each of the intercollegiate halls of residence is managed by a Hall Manager. Every hall also has a Warden and a number of resident Senior Members. The Hall Managers and their staff work full-time during office hours, while the Wardens and Senior Members, commonly referred to as the Wardenial staff, are part-time staff who are either studying or working in academic or academic-related roles elsewhere in the University of London.

The Junior Common Room (JCR) Committee, elected by the students, provides social and sporting activities.

== Transport ==
The nearest underground stations are Goodge Street to the west, Euston Square to the north and Russell Square to the east.

== See also ==
- Connaught Hall, London
- International Hall, London
