= Louisa Mallet =

British activist for women's education

- Born: Louisa Tempe Udny; 15 April 1837; Kolkata, British India
- Died: 2 July 1904 (aged 67); Bournemouth, England
- Other name: Louisa Tempe Mallet
- Occupation: Activist
- Spouse: Charles Mallet (m. 1859)
- Children: Sir Charles Edward Mallet
- Parent: George Udny

Louisa Tempe Udny (later Mallet; 15 April 1837 – 2 July 1904) was a British activist for women's education.

== Life ==
Louisa Tempe Udny was born in 1837 in Kolkata, India. Her parents were Frances (nee Hannay) and Scottish-born Bengal civil servant George Udny. She married Charles Mallet in 1859. In 1862, they had a son who in time would be Sir Charles Mallet M.P.

In the 1870s the Women's Education Union (WEU) was active striving to create educational opportunities for girls with academic ambitions. The WEU was not only trying to increase the number of secondary schools for girls but also trying to raise the ambitions of the schools that did exist. The WEU's leading figures were two sisters Emily Shirreff and Maria Grey. From 1876 to 1881 Mallet was on the WEU central committee. In 1980 she also became involved in the management of Lisson Grove elementary schools in Marylebone, working with Alice Westlake.

In November 1888 the Society for Promoting the Return of Women as County Councillors was formed by twelve women at Sarah Amos's house. The group included Elizabeth Lidgett and her sister Mary Bunting and it was led by Annie Leigh Browne. It was deciding suitable women candidates for election.

Mallet, Annie Leigh Browne, Eva McLaren, the Marchioness of Aberdeen and Millicent Fawcett were key members. In 1891 she stood unsuccessfully for the Lambeth school board. She lost but only a small amount in an election where Emma Maitland lost her seat. In 1893 the society changed its name to Women's Local Government Society (WLGS), reflecting its wish to encourage women to be involved in politics and not exclusively in county councils.

She attended the International Congress of Women in 1899 and served on the WLGS executive committee until 1901.

Louisa Tempe Mallet died in 1904, aged 67, in Bournemouth.
