= George Udny =

British civil servant, barrister and author

George Udny (1803–1879) was a British civil servant in India, barrister and author.

== Life ==
He was the son of Robert George Udny (died 1830) and his wife Temperance Sophia Fleming (died 1854), and great-nephew of Robert Udny, plantation owner on Grenada. He was born into a family of nine children, of whom the five sons who grew to adulthood all joined the service of the East India Company. He was educated at East India Company College 1818–20, winning a prize in Persian.

Udny became a writer of the Bengal Civil Service in 1819. He was acting magistrate of Jessore 1823, and acting import warehouse keeper 1826–7. He went home on leave in 1827, and returned to India 2 October 1830. He was secretary and treasurer of the Bank of Bengal 17 September 1833 to 1840. On furlough 1840–3, Udny was sub-treasurer to the general treasury Bengal 1843, and retired on the annuity fund 1851.

Returning to the United Kingdom, Udny became a barrister of Lincoln's Inn 6 June 1855. He died at 142 Adelaide Road, Hampstead, 7 April 1879.

== Works ==
Udny wrote:

- A word on "The Currency" 1845
- A word on law in general, and on the law of England, and the study of it in particular 1855
- Executory interests of the law of England 1857
- Harmony of laws; or, examination of the principles of the laws of civilized nations 1858.

== Family ==
Udny married, firstly, in 1836 Frances Hanway Ryan, eldest daughter of Sir Edward Ryan, who died in Calcutta in 1838 leaving two children. Their daughter Louisa Tempe Udny, born in Calcutta in 1837, was an activist for female education and in feminist politics. She married in 1859 the civil servant Charles Mallet, brother of Louis Mallet, and was mother of Charles Edward Mallet MP.

In 1844, Udny married, secondly, Anne Lydia Tomkins (died 1897), daughter of Samuel Tomkins (the elder) of Russell Place, London, a banker with Willis, Percival & Co. Their children included:

- Richard Udny (1847–1923). He married in 1883 Alice Tomkins, daughter of the banker Samuel Tomkins. This was a first cousin marriage, Alice being the niece of Anne Lydia. There were successive bankers named Samuel Tomkins who worked at Willis, Percival & Co. Anne Lydia's father was Samuel Tomkins the elder, who married Eliza Alicia Isabella Smith, daughter of Edward Tyrrell Smith RN. Samuel Tomkins junior, father of Alice, was her brother. The family were therefore close to a bank failure, thought at the time to reflect badly on the private banking sector.
- Emily, who married Edward Hermon
- Mary, who married in 1874 John Bailey Haslam.

=== Udny v Udny ===
George Udny brought a bastardy case against a family member John Henry Udny, grandson of John Udny who was brother to Robert Udny. Turning on an issue of domicile, English or Scottish, on a point where the legal systems differed, this case of conflict of laws was resolved by a House of Lords ruling in Udny v Udny of 1869, which declared John Henry Udny legitimate. The outcome affected possession of a family estate in Aberdeenshire. Lord Westbury's speech has been described as a "classical exposition of the concept of Domicile at Common Law"; and the decision reached made Udny v Udny a leading case for conflict of laws.
