= Sheldon Amos =

English jurist

Sheldon Amos (1 June 1835 – 3 January 1886) was an English jurist.

== Life and career ==
Sheldon Amos was born in St Pancras, London, the son of lawyer Andrew Amos and his wife, Margaret. He was educated at Clare College, Cambridge, and was called to the bar as a member of the Inner Temple in 1862. He was invited by F. D. Maurice to teach at The Working Men's College, with fellow Cambridge graduates and friends Richard Chenevix Trench and J. R. Seeley. In 1869 he was appointed to the chair of jurisprudence in University College, London, and in 1872 became reader under the council of legal education and examiner in constitutional law and history to the University of London. Failing health led to his resignation of those offices, and he took a voyage to the South Seas.

He resided for a short time at Sydney, and finally settled in Egypt, where he practised as an advocate. After the bombardment of Alexandria, and the reorganization of the Egyptian judicature, he was appointed judge of the court of appeal, but being without any previous experience of administrative work he found the strain too great for his health.

== Death ==
He came to England on leave in the autumn of 1885, and on his return to Egypt he died suddenly at Ramleh, near Alexandria, on 3 January 1886.

== Family ==
His wife, Sarah Amos (the former Sarah Maclardie Bunting), took a prominent part in Liberal Nonconformist politics and in movements connected with the position of women. The first meeting of what would become the Women's Local Government Society was held at her house and included several of her relatives. The group was led by Annie Leigh Browne and it was deciding suitable women candidates for election. Sarah died at Cairo on 21 January 1908.

Their son was Sir Maurice Amos.

== Publications ==
His principal publications are:

- Systematic View of the Science of Jurisprudence (1872)
- Lectures on International Law (1873)
- Science of Law (1874)
- Science of Politics (1883)
- History and Principles of the Civil Law of Rome as Aid to the Study of Scientific and Comparative Jurisprudence (1883)
