= John Udny =

Scottish diplomat

John Udny (21 March 1727 – 1800) was a Scottish diplomat who served as British Consul at Venice and Livorno.

== Early life ==
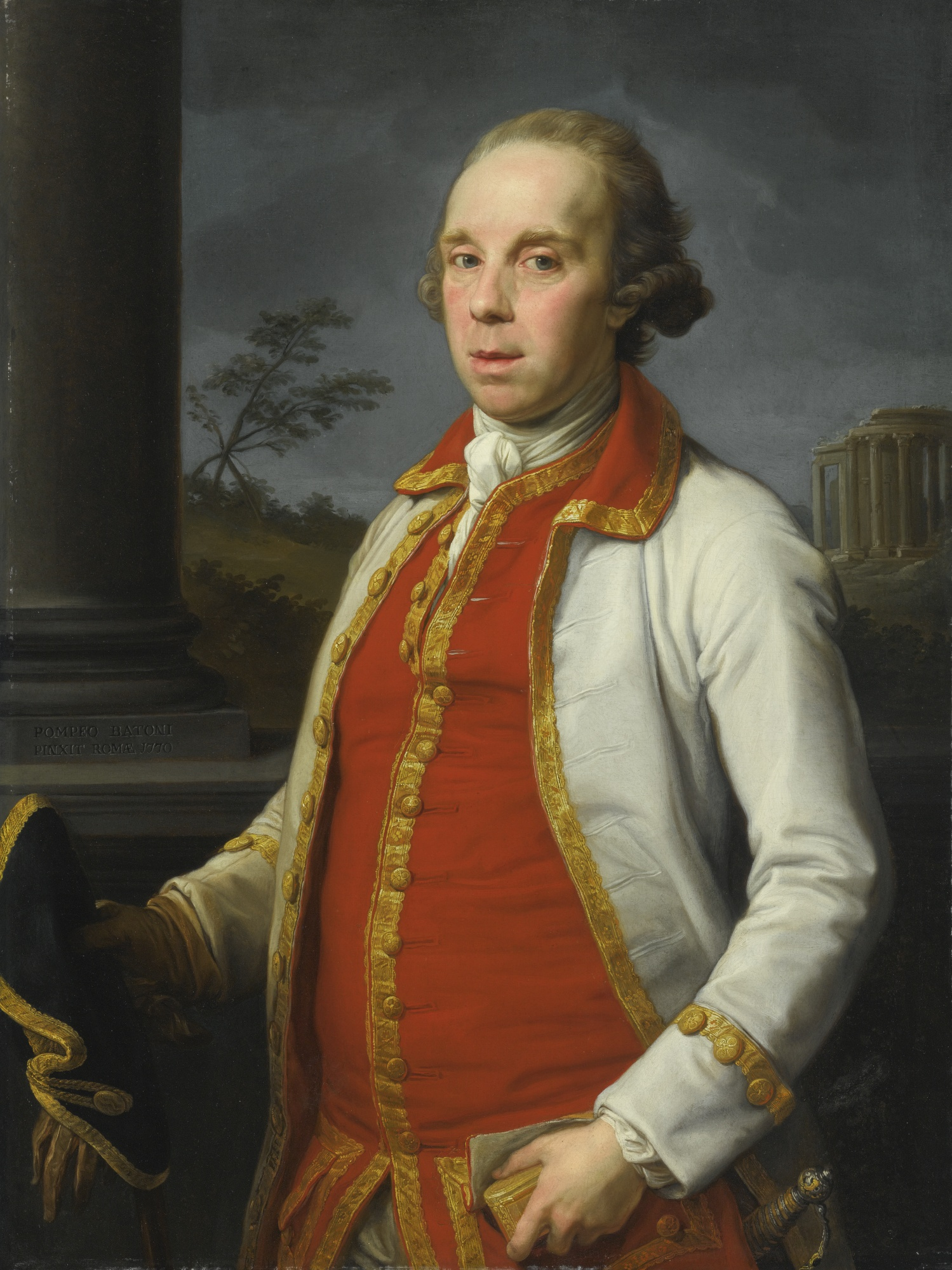
Portrait of his elder brother Robert Udny by Pompeo Girolamo Batoni

Udny was born into Clan Udny on 21 March 1727 in Aberdeen, Scotland. He was the son of James Udny, advocate, and Jane (née Walker) Udny. He was a brother of Robert Fullerton Udny of Udny, Dudwick and Newburgh. (Note: Robert Fullerton Udny (1722–1802) married Mary Hougham (daughter of Culpeper Hougham and sister-in-law of Spencer Compton, 8th Earl of Northampton). Their daughter, Mary Udny, married Sir William Cunynghame, 4th Baronet.)

His maternal grandfather was Alexander Walker, Lord Provost of Aberdeen.

== Career ==
He went to Italy and became engaged in business in Venice, where he lived. In 1761, he was appointed British Consul at Venice, holding the office until 1777 when he was appointed Consul at Leghorn. He held that role until his death in 1800.

"During his residence at Venice and Leghorn, he was in the practice of buying Italian works of art and sending them home for sale. He also supplied His Britannic Majesty's ships with fresh provisions when they touched at Leghorn, which was a perquisite of the consulship, and he seemed, further, in partnership with some other parties at Leghorn, to have entered into contracts for victualling the Mediterranean fleet." He also acted as intermediary for Henry Farnum, a Philadelphia collector, and the British sculptor John Gibson.

== Personal life ==
In August 1777, Udny married Selina Shore Cleveland, a daughter of John Clevland MP and Secretary to the Admiralty and, his third wife, Sarah Shuckburgh (the daughter of Charles Shuckburgh and a sister of Sir Charles Shuckburgh, 5th Baronet). Together, they were the parents of two children, both born at Leghorn:

- Julia Udny (b. c. 1778), who married William Richard Hamilton, the son of Rev. Anthony Hamilton, Archdeacon of Colchester and the former Anne Terrick (daughter of Richard Terrick, Bishop of London), in 1804; Hamilton later served as British Minister to the Kingdom of the Two Sicilies in the 1820s.
- John Robert Fullerton Udny (1779–1861), who married Emily Fitzhugh (c. 1780–1846), daughter of Thomas Fitzhugh of Plus Power, in 1812. After her death he married Ann Allat, daughter of David Allat.

In 1784, Selina and their children went to London with their children. In 1794 his elder brother became proprietor of the estates of Udny. As he had no sons, John became the heir next entitled to succeed. During his later years, John "carried out considerable correspondnece with his brother, and purchased parts of a property contiguous to the Udny estates."

Udny died in 1800. His son John inherited his estate and the estates of his uncle Robert Fullerton Udny in 1802 which, upon his death in 1861, passed, after a legal battle with his extended cousin George Udny, to John Henry Udny, (Note: John Henry Udny (1853–c. 1894) married Amy Camilla Sinclair, a daughter of Sir John Sinclair, 3rd Baronet, MP for Caithness, on 8 July 1874. Udny had a mansion house built in the baronial style on the Udny estate between 1874 and 1875 (which was demolished during the 1960s).) his second son from his marriage to Ann Allat. The younger Udny had attended Eton in 1868.

=== Descendants ===
Through his daughter Julia, he was a grandfather of geologist William John Hamilton (1805–1867); (Note: William John Hamilton (1805–1867) married Hon. Margaret Frances Florence Dillon, a daughter of Henry Dillon, 13th Viscount Dillon; their son was Alexander Hamilton, 10th Lord Belhaven and Stenton.) Alexander Edmund Hamilton (1806–1827); Capt. Henry George Hamilton (1808–1879); (Note: Capt. Henry George Hamilton (1808–1879) of the Royal Navy married Fanny Elizabeth Tower and was the father of Adm. Sir Frederick Hamilton.) Charles Anthony Hamilton (1809–1860); Arthur Richard Hamilton (1814–1882); and Gen. Frederick William Hamilton (1815–1890). (Note: Gen. Frederick William Hamilton (1815–1890) married Louisa Anne Erskin Anstruther, a daughter of Sir Alexander Anstruther.)
