= Mary Stewart Kilgour =

Educationist and feminist (1851–1955)

- Born: 24 September 1851; Longford, Van Diemen's Land
- Died: 31 March 1955 (aged 103); Honiton, England
- Occupations: Educator, writer, suffragist

Mary Stewart Kilgour (24 September 1851 – 31 March 1955) was a suffragist, educationalist, writer and campaigner for women's rights.

== Family ==
Kilgour was one of 13 children born to a Scottish physician, Dr John Stewart Kilgour (1815 – 1902), and Susan Anne (née Archer). Kilgour was born in Longford, Van Diemen's Land (now Tasmania) in 1851. Her family returned to Britain in 1854, living in Worcester, London, Exmouth and the Isle of Man before settling in Cheltenham in around 1860. Her older sister Agnes Archer Kilgour would become the first President of Leicester's Literary and Philosophical Society. She was born in Longford, Tasmania in 1848.

== Work ==
In 1882, Kilgour collaborated with Annie Leigh Browne, Browne's sister Mary (later Lady Lockyer) and Henrietta Müller to found College Hall, London.

She was also involved with the Browne sisters in the running of the Women's Local Government Society, succeeding Annie as honorary treasurer from 1892 to 1900, after which Mary Browne (who married scientist Sir Norman Lockyer in 1903) retained the post until 1918. Active in Liberal Party circles, she helped found the Union of Practical Suffragists, co-authoring one of its pamphlets (c. 1899).

== Writing ==
- Women as Members of Local Sanitary Authorities (pamphlet published by the Women's Local Government Society, 1896)
- Women and the London Government Bill (published by the Women's Local Government Society, 1899)
- The London Government Act: The latest disqualification of women (1899)
- Position of women in secondary education (1899)
- The James Stansfeld Memorial Trust. Its Origin and Work (published by Women's Printing Society, 1934)
