= Sidney Bunting =

British-born South African solicitor and communist politician (1873–1936)

Sidney Percival Bunting (29 June 1873 – 25 May 1936) was a British-born South African politician. He was a founding member of the Communist Party of South Africa (CPSA).

== Early life ==
Sidney Bunting was born in Oakley Square on 29 June 1873 in London, UK. His father was Sir Percy William Bunting, the long-time editor of the British quarterly magazine 'The Contemporary Review', a liberal social reform magazine. His mother, Mary Hyett Bunting, née Lidgett – elder sister of Elizabeth Sedman Lidgett – was a social worker and campaigner for social reform in the poor parts of London, who invited people from many countries to her home. He had a brother and two sisters.

Two mission stations in what would later be South Africa were named after his great-grandfather, Jabez Bunting, a Methodist minister.

Bunting attended St Paul's School, a public school in London, and went on to study Classics at Magdalen College, the University of Oxford. There he won the Chancellor's Prize in 1897. Upon leaving university, he trained at a law firm to become a solicitor.

== Arrival in Johannesburg ==
In 1900, he joined British army as a volunteer during the Second Boer War, after which he stayed in Johannesburg. Through private studies, he obtained a Bachelor of Laws in 1904 from the South African College, Cape Town, so he could work as a lawyer. He was also an amateur string player, organised concerts and worked as a music critic.

In 1916, he married Rebecca Notlewitz, of Jewish descent, who emigrated from Lithuania.

== Political career ==
Bunting was an early exponent of the South African Labour Party (SALP), which was constituted following strikes that took place from 1907 onwards, and was shaped by members of the middle class of European origin. In the Transvaal provincial elections of March 1914, the Labour Party secured a majority of one seat, and Bunting was elected to represent Bezuidenhout Valley by a substantial majority.

The SALP maintained close ties with the country's trade unions, but took reactionary and conservative positions with regard to demographic inequalities in the Cape Colony labour market. It propagated the privileges of white workers in gold mining and its related industrial sectors. In September 1914, Bunting led some members of the party to oppose participation by the Union of South Africa in World War I. Along with other opponents to participation, he was excluded from the party, and consequently he became a co-founder of the International Socialist League (ISL).

Bunting had supported the Russian October Revolution, and the ISL would be the forerunner to the Communist Party of South Africa (CPSA).

In 1921, Sidney and Rebecca Bunting were among the founding members of the CPSA. In 1922, they both visited the Congress of the Communist International (Comintern) in Moscow, in the Soviet Union. Upon returning, Sidney Bunting became secretary of the CPSA. In 1924, he became its chairman.

As chairman, he tried to persuade black opposition figures into revolution. The party had recruited numerous black members and Bunting defended many of them in court, often without financial payment. In 1928, he returned to the Soviet Union and protested against the Comintern's decision that the CPSA should support the establishment of a "Native Republic", but the sixth Comintern Congress stuck to its demand.

In the 1929 general election, Bunting campaigned as the CPSA candidate for Thembuland, Transkei. Despite the large number of black voters in this constituency, he only received 289 votes.

== Later years ==
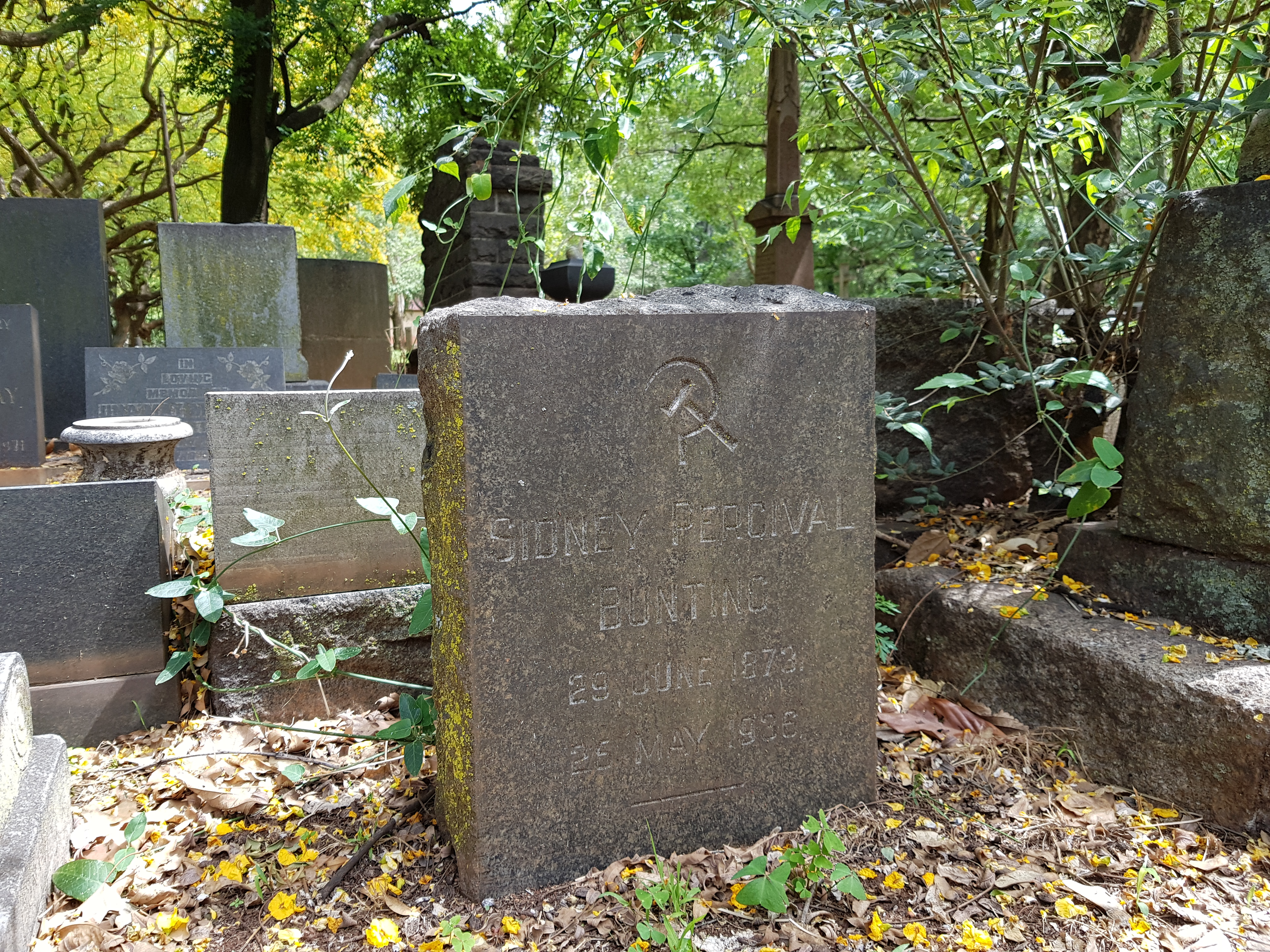

In 1931, Bunting was excluded from the party as a counter-revolutionary, due to political differences. Financially crippled and no longer able to work as a lawyer, he became a viola player in a touring cinema orchestra.

Following a stroke, his fingers became paralysed and he worked as a caretaker. He died on 25 May 1936 after a second stroke.

His cremated remains are interred at Braamfontein Cemetery, Johannesburg.

Sidney and Rebecca Bunting had two children:

- Arthur Bunting, an agricultural botanist at the University of Reading
- Brian Bunting, who became a leading member of the South African Communist Party (SACP) and editor-in-chief of numerous opposition newspapers

== Works ==
- S.P. Bunting: Res Nautica apud Antiquos: Oratio Latina, Chancellor's Latin Essay. B.H. Blackwell, Oxford 1897
- Brian Bunting (ed.): Letters to Rebecca: South African communist leader S.P. Bunting to his wife, 1917-1934. Mayibuye history and literature series, episode 67, Mayibuye Books, UWC, Bellville 1996, ISBN 978-1868082995.

== Literature ==
- Allison Drew: Between Empire and Revolution: A Life of Sidney Bunting (PDF 3.55MB). Routledge, London, New York 2007, ISBN 978-1851968930.
- Edward Rudolph Roux: S.P. Bunting. A political biography (PDF 627KB). Cape Town 1944.
