= George Udny (planter) =

British planter in India (c. 1760–1830)

(Robert) George Udny (c. 1760–1830) was a British planter in India, who later was employed by the Bengal Civil Service. He was a supporter of the Baptist missionaries Rev. John Thomas and William Carey.

== Background ==
He was the son of Ernest and Sarah Udny, and nephew of Robert Udny. There was a strong West Indian background: Robert Udny owned enslaved people and a sugar plantation on Grenada, and Ernest, of Aberdeen and Calaveny, Grenada, died on the island. George Udny was born 1759/60, and in 1778 became a writer (clerk) in the British East India Company in Bengal.

== Factory at Malda ==
Udny became an indigo planter in the Bengal Presidency, in the role of Commercial Resident. Initially, in the 1780s, he was the main assistant to Charles Grant in his silk factory near Malda city. It was at English Bazaar (Ingraj Bazar), in the fortified compound of the Commercial Resident. Grant also was an indigo planter in the area, in business on his own account. This he claimed as an innovation, at Gaumalti (near Gauḍa south of Malda), and he stated the intention of developing alternative employment for local weavers. The commercial viability of the crop, as a commodity used for dying, turned out to be problematic.

Udny succeeded Grant, who moved to Calcutta to head the Board of Trade. He took up the position of Commercial Resident in 1787, holding it to 1799. From 1788, Grant supported indigo planters, in particular with loans.

Grant in 1787 circulated A Proposal for Establishing a Protestant Mission in Bengal and Behar, with which Udny was associated, as was William Chambers, brother of Robert Chambers. The Baptist missionaries John Thomas and William Carey arrived together in Bengal in November 1793, and were soon in financial straits. Thomas was a naval surgeon and a protégé of Grant, a noted evangelical, who brought him to Gaumalti to carry out mission work in 1787–9. He had more recently been in Malda studying Bengali.

Thomas therefore knew Udny well, but they had not parted on good terms, Udny withdrawing support because of erratic behaviour by Thomas. When Udny's brother Robert and wife Ann died in a boat accident, Thomas made it a pretext to contact Udny. There resulted an offer from Udny, of salaried managerial employment at new indigo factories being set up by Udny in the Malda area, north of the city and towards Dinajpur. At the time the early effects of the Haitian Revolution of 1791 had removed supplies of indigo from Saint-Domingue in the European market. In 1795, the East India Company put heavy funding behind the crop, because of its place in remittances for its British employees. A few years later, however, Great Britain was experiencing a glut of Indian indigo.

For Thomas this factory post was at Moypaldiggy (Mahipaladighi, "the tank (reservoir) of Mahipala I", Bansihari). He continued to let down his patrons, left the indigo factor role to trade in sugar, returned, and died in Dinajpur in 1801 of infectious disease. For Carey, it was at nearby Mudnabatty (Madnawati, Bamangola), both factories therefore being close what is now the India-Bangladesh border, and 16 miles (26 km) apart. Carey was in charge of the factory for five years, studied the languages of Bengal, and left to join William Ward and other missionaries in Frederiknagore, Danish territory where their work was allowed.

== In Calcutta ==
From 1801 to 1807, Udny was on the Bengal Council. In 1805, a year of transition, he served as deputy to the Governor-General of India.

Udny shared Grant's Christian outlook: David Brown, Claudius Buchanan, Henry Martyn and Thomas Thomason, with Udny were members of a Church Missionary Society committee in Calcutta in 1807. He continued to work closely with Carey: he was, according to Stephen Neill, the "prime mover" behind Carey's 1802 enquiry into infanticide on Sagar Island, reporting to Andrew Fuller.
