= Henry Willis (cricketer) =

English cricketer

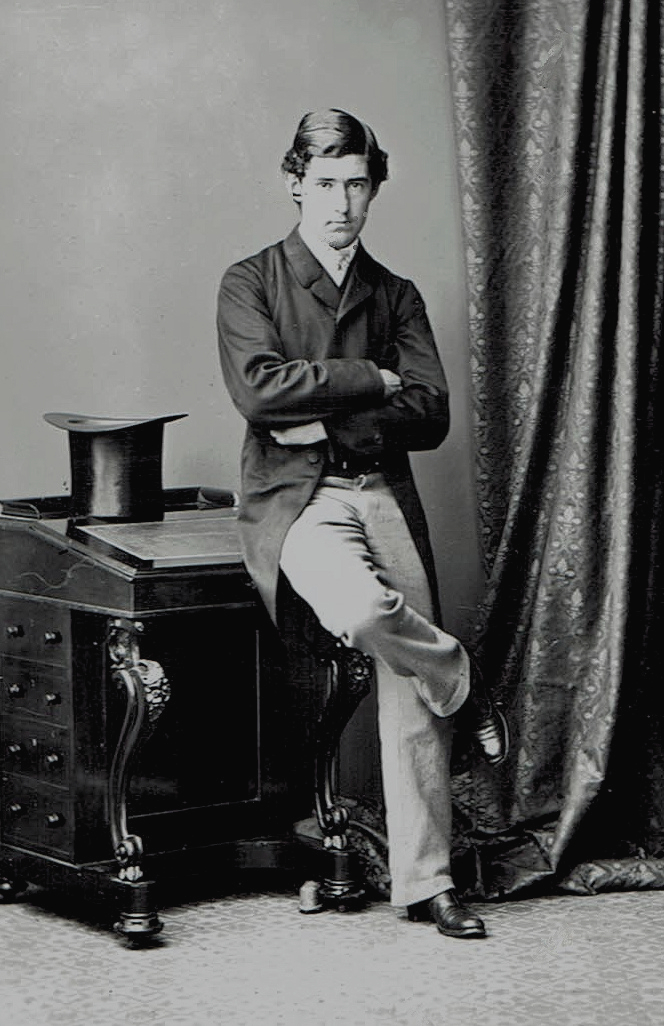

Personal information
- Full name: Henry Willis
- Born: 17 March 1841; Sydenham, Kent, England
- Died: 29 September 1926 (aged 85); Horton, Epsom, Surrey, England

Domestic team information
- Years: Team
- 1868: Surrey

Career statistics
Competition	First-class
Matches	1
Runs scored	7
Batting average	3.50
100s/50s	0/0
Top score	7
Catches/stumpings	0/–
- Source: Cricinfo, 23 June 2012

Henry Willis (17 March 1841 – 29 September 1926) was an English banker and cricketer.

== Life ==
He was born at Sydenham, Kent, the eldest son of Henry Willis, of Horton Lodge, Epsom, a banker in Lombard Street. His sister Marianne married in 1862 Henry Paull, the Member of Parliament.

Willis was educated privately. By 1863 he was working in Willis, Percival & Co., the private bank in Lombard Street at which his father was the senior partner. When the bank failed in 1878, his personal assets contributed in the liquidation to the settlement of liabilities. The bank was taken over, and he became a manager of the new concern at the same address.

== Cricketer ==
Willis's batting style is unknown. He made a single first-class appearance for Surrey against Yorkshire in 1868 at The Oval. Surrey won the toss and elected to bat, making 195 all out, with Willis being dismissed during the innings for a duck by Tom Emmett. Yorkshire responded by making 389 all out in their first-innings, to which Surrey responded in their second-innings by being dismissed for just 52, with Willis being dismissed by George Atkinson for 7 runs. Yorkshire won the match by an innings and 142 runs.

This was Willis's only major appearance for Surrey. He was the Captain of the Epsom Cricket Club for many years.

== Family ==
In 1866, Willis married Emmeline, daughter of James Levick of Hookfield, Epsom; they had a son, Henry — who married Mina Gertrude, daughter of the cricketer E. M. Grace — and six daughters. Willis died at Horton Lodge near Horton, Surrey, on 29 September 1926.
