= Percy Bunting =

English journalist

Sir Percy William Bunting CBE
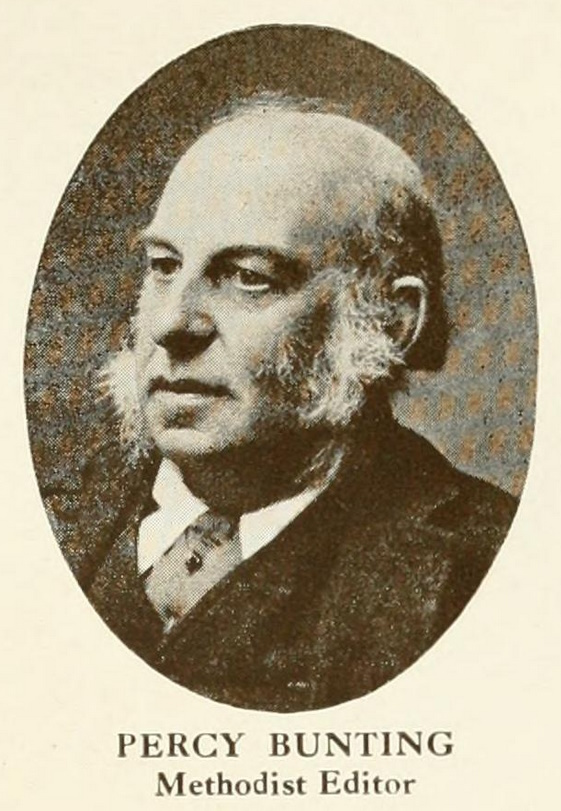
- Photographic portrait

Personal details
- Born: Percy William Bunting; 1 February 1836 Radcliffe, Lancashire, England
- Died: 22 July 1911 (aged 75) London

Sir Percy William Bunting (1 February 1836 – 22 July 1911) was an English barrister, editor and social reformer.

During his early legal career, Bunting became actively involved in liberal politics and progressive Methodism. He was the editor of The Contemporary Review from 1882 until his death in 1911. His work as a social reformer encompassed a leading role in the National Vigilance Association, addressing juvenile prostitution. Bunting was also involved in religious reform within the Methodist Church, as well as taking an active role in an association of Nonconformist churches and broader ecumenical concerns.

== Biography ==
=== Early years ===
Percy William Bunting was born on 1 February 1836 at Radcliffe in Lancashire, the only son of Thomas Percival Bunting and Eliza (née Bealey). His father was a solicitor in Manchester. Percy had three sisters, Mary (born in 1833), Eliza (born in 1838) and Sarah (born in 1841). The children, whose paternal grandfather was the prominent Wesleyan Methodist leader Jabez Bunting, were raised in a devout household.

Percy Bunting was educated at home until 1851, when he became one of the original students at the newly-opened Owen's College in Manchester. He was awarded a scholarship to Pembroke College at the University of Cambridge. In 1859 Bunting was classed as the twentieth 'wrangler', denoting a ranking of those who gained first-class honours in the Mathematical Tripos competition. He graduated that year with a Master of Arts.

=== Legal practice ===
In 1862 Bunting was called to the bar at Lincoln's Inn, where he practiced law and acquired a large practice as a conveyancer and at the Chancery bar. He was an "examiner in equity and real property at the London University for some years".

Bunting married Mary Hyett Lidgett on 21 June 1869, the elder sister of Elizabeth Lidgett. The couple had four children: two daughters (Evelyn, born in 1870, and Dora, born in 1877) and two sons (Sidney, born in 1873, and Sheldon, born in 1882).

Bunting was one of the founders and served as a governor of The Leys School at Cambridge which opened in 1875, a public school under Wesleyan management.

=== A liberal editor ===
In politics Bunting was a liberal and an admirer of William Gladstone. He served on the executive committee of the National Liberal Federation from 1880 until his death. In 1881 Bunting was a member of the executive committee of the Marylebone United Liberal Association.

In 1882 Bunting was appointed editor of The Contemporary Review, a position he occupied until his death in 1911. He conducted the journal with a liberal slant, supportive of social reform. He encouraged writers in the fields of contemporary theology, science, art, literature and politics and enlisted foreign correspondents. Bunting grew less active in his legal profession after becoming editor of The Contemporary Review. It was said of him that he had "no great interest in legal work; he was devoted, heart and soul, to social and religious movements".

Throughout his life, Bunting was an active supporter of Wesleyan Methodism. He became an advocate of the 'Forward Movement', a liberal strand within Methodism that emerged in the mid-1880s to address urban poverty. This movement led to the establishment of the West London Mission in 1887 under the leadership of Hugh Price Hughes. Bunting took on the role of treasurer of the mission. In the Wesleyan Conference, where he sat as a lay representative, he served for many years as the lay secretary of the Committee of Privileges.

Bunting took an active part in the 'Social Purity' movement with his sister Sarah Amos and Mrs. Josephine Butler. From 1885 until his death Bunting was the chairman of the executive committee of the National Vigilance Association, established in August 1885 in response to articles by W. T. Stead exposing juvenile prostitution in London, published in the Pall Mall Gazette. Bunting frequently visited European countries promoting moral purity as a social reform.

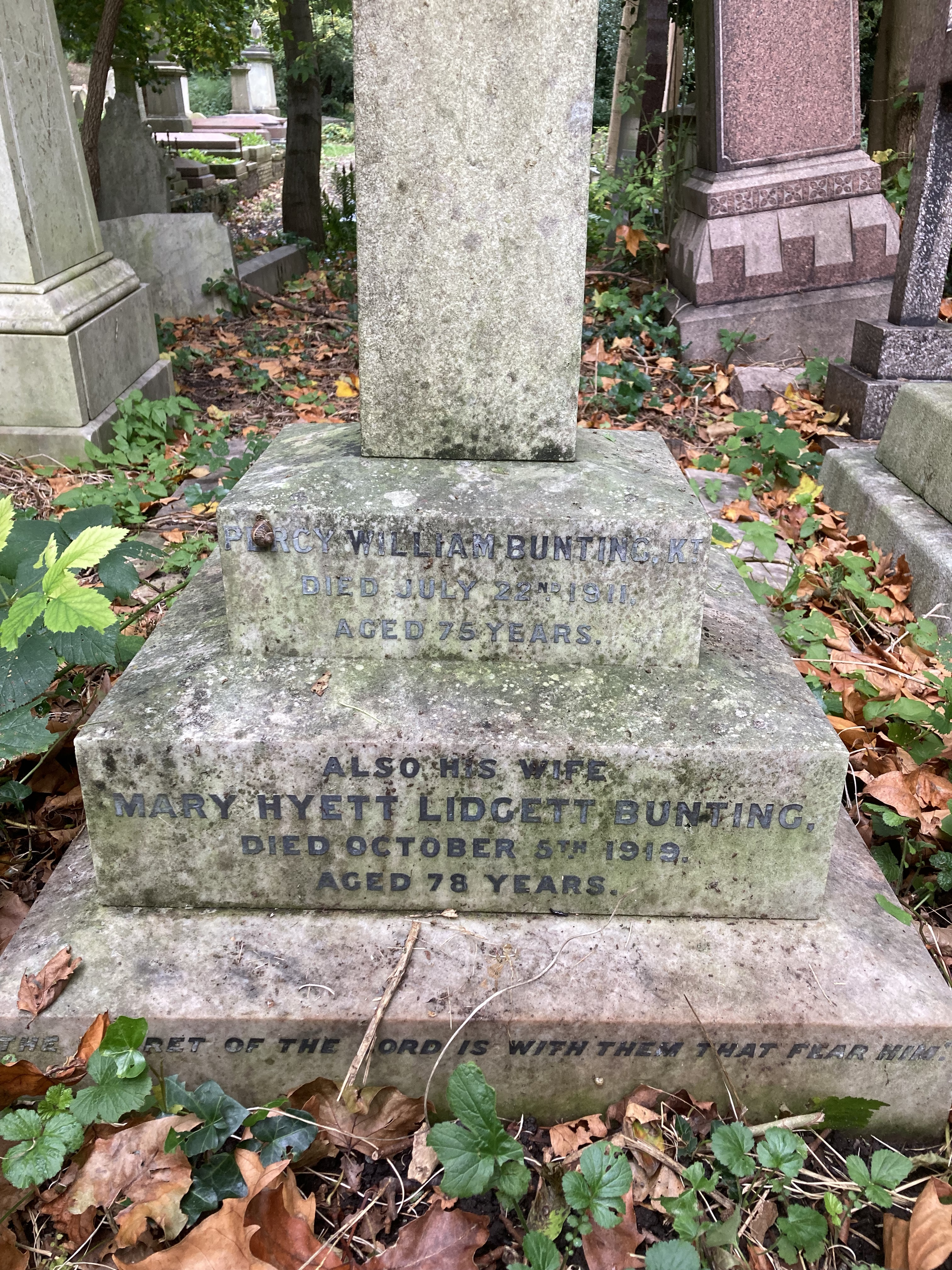
The grave of Percy William Bunting in Highgate Cemetery.

In 1891 Henry S. Lunn founded a journal called The Review of the Churches with the intention of furthering the concept of a union of the churches. Lunn was general editor of the journal, which also had editors representing various protestant denominations: Archdeacon Frederic Farrar (Anglican), Percy Bunting (Methodist), Dr. MacKennal (Congregationalist), Dr. Clifford (Baptist) and Dr. Donald Fraser (Presbyterian). Bunting remained as Methodist editor of The Review of the Churches until 1896. He was actively involved in the formation of the Free Church Federation in the mid-1890s, an association of British Nonconformist churches. The Free Church movement had been initiated in 1891 at a dinner party at Bunting's house in Euston Square in London.

In the general election of July 1892 Bunting stood unsuccessfully as a Liberal candidate for the electorate of Islington East.

Bunting retired from his law practice in about 1895.

After the death of Hugh Price Hughes in November 1902, Bunting took on the role of editor of the Methodist Times, a journal of progressive Methodism (concurrent with his editorship of The Contemporary Review). In 1907 Bunting was replaced as editor of the Methodist Times by his nephew John Scott Lidgett.

=== Last years ===
Bunting was awarded a knighthood in June 1908.

Bunting was an advocate of international peace and friendship. He visited Germany in 1907 and 1909 and assisted in the formation of the Anglo-German Friendship Committee in the months before his death.

In the last three years of his life, Bunting's physical powers slowly declined. Sir Percy Bunting died on 22 July 1911 at his home in London, at 11 Endsleigh Gardens in Bloomsbury, aged 75. He was buried at Highgate Cemetery (on the western side).

== Publications ==
- Percy W. Bunting, 'Chapter XI: The Land and the Citizen' (in) Samuel E. Keeble (editor) (1906), The Citizen of To-morrow: A Handbook on Social Questions, London: Charles H. Kelly, pages 207-222.
- Rev. John Brown Paton, Sir Percy William Bunting & Rev. Alfred Ernest Garvie (editors) (1910), Christ and Civilization: A Survey of the Influence of the Christian Religion Upon the Course of Civilization, London: National Council of Evangelical Free Churches.

Articles by Bunting published in The Contemporary Review include: 'Reminiscences of Cardinal Manning' (1892), 'Nonconformists and the Education Bill' (1902), 'The White Slave Trade' (1902), 'The Journalistic Tour in Germany' (1907), 'Convocation and the Bishop of Hereford' (1911).
