= Henrietta Müller =

British women's rights activist

Muller in 1893

Frances Henrietta Müller (1846 – 4 January 1906) was a British women's rights activist and theosophist.

== Biography ==
Müller was born in Valparaíso, Chile to William Müller, a German businessman, and Maria Henrietta Müller who was English. As a child, she received little in the way of formal schooling but spoke six languages and was admitted to Girton College at the University of Cambridge in 1873. It was there that she became involved in the feminist movement, helping to found women's trade unions and the Women's Printing Society with Emma Paterson.

Müller left Cambridge in 1878 and in the same year stood for election to the London School Board. Her campaign was successful, and she became one of the first female members of the board. During her term, she convinced the board to employ female workers—"cannily pointing out that this would save money since women were paid less than men"—and was involved with Annie Leigh Browne and Mary Stewart Kilgour in establishing the first women's residence hall (College Hall) in Bloomsbury before leaving the board in 1885.

In 1883 Müller, and others, founded the Society for Promoting the Return of Women as Poor Law Guardians, believing that work in the Poor Law system was best suited to women. She was an executive member of the National Vigilance Association, which opposed the sexual exploitation of women and supported the closure of brothels, but resigned in 1888 when the organisation described pamphlets about contraception as "vicious literature"; Müller believed that contraception could empower women. She was also on the executive committee of the National Society for Women's Suffrage and was a supporter of the temperance movement.

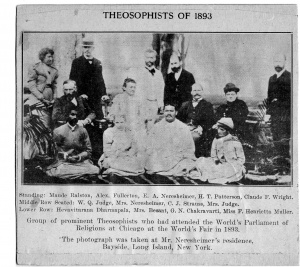
Theosophists of 1893 in New York – includes Annie Besant and Müller on the front row

Müller wrote numerous articles for the Westminster Review which discussed the empowerment of unmarried women and criticised contemporary marriage. In 1888 she founded her own periodical, The Women's Penny Paper (later titled The Woman's Signal), the first women's newspaper in London; she edited the paper under the pen name Helena B. Temple.

By 1891, Müller had mostly withdrawn from politics and feminist activism, and joined the Theosophical Society. The next year she travelled to India as a lecturer on behalf of the society and became known as "the renowned woman-suffragist". After meeting Swami Vivekananda at the Parliament of the World's Religions in 1893 she edited a number of his books, including Lectures from Colombo to Almora, published in 1897. She adopted a Bengali son in 1895. She later moved to China and then the United States, where she died in 1906 in Washington, D.C. Her estate was left to her sister Eva McLaren, also a women's rights activist, with no mention of her adopted son in her will.
