= Elizabeth Lidgett =

British Poor Law guardian and suffragist

- Born: 26 August 1843; Mile End, London
- Died: 8 April 1919 (aged 75); Gordon Square, London

Elizabeth Sedman Lidgett (26 August 1843 – 8 April 1919) was a British Poor Law guardian and suffragist.

== Life ==
Lidgett was born in Mile End in East London to John Lidgett, a shipowner, and Ann Lidgett (née Hyett) on 26 August 1843. Her elder sister, Mary Hyett, married Percy Bunting in 1869 and John Scott Lidgett was her nephew.

She was elected in April 1881 to be a Poor Law Guardian in St Pancras. Another guardian was Sarah Ward Andrews who had formed a group to encourage women to stand for these positions of responsibility. Elizabeth and her sister Mary were both inspired to good works by their membership of the Charity Organization Society. The Charity Organization Society was inspired to target work at the deserving poor whilst trying to avoid creating an expectation of dependency. At this stage women were being welcomed to serve in some public areas. They were helping to organise the workhouses for the poor and to supervise the process where children were "boarded out" and to help with schools serving the legal requirement to educate poor children. However it was apparent that women were expected to restrict themselves to these areas. For instance her sister was told by the male members of the Metropolitan Association for Befriending Young Servants that the women on the committee might assist with finding positions for female paupers.

In November 1888 she and her sister Mary attended the first meeting of what would become the Women's Local Government Society at Sarah Amos's house. The group was led by Annie Leigh Browne and it was deciding suitable women candidates for election. Lidgett was offered the opportunity of standing to be a London County Councillor in 1889 but she refused. That same year she became involved in the management of the Gray's Inn Road schools. This was a position of some ambition as women were allowed to serve on school boards many years before they were given equal electoral rights in 1928.

Lidgett worked with Florence Davenport Hill. Lidgett was a Poor Law Guardian in St Pancras for nearly forty years and she continued always to support the Women's Local Government Society. She died on 8 April 1919 of a pulmonary malignant disease while living at 40 Gordon Square, London.
