= Geraldine Aves =

English civil servant and social reformer

Dame Geraldine Aves DBE
- fair use only
- Born: Geraldine Maitland Aves; 22 August 1898; Hertfordshire, England
- Died: 23 June 1986 (aged 87)
- Education: Newnham College, Cambridge
- Occupation: Civil servant
- Notable work: The Voluntary Worker in the Social Services

Dame Geraldine Maitland Aves, DBE (22 August 1898 – 23 June 1986) was a British civil servant, United Nations advisor on welfare, and social reformer.

== Early life ==
Aves was born on 22 August 1898 in Hertfordshire to social reformer Harry Ernest Aves and Eva Mary Aves (born Maitland). Her mother was a daughter of suffragist and educationalist Emma Maitland. She was educated at Frognal School and then Newnham College, Cambridge, where she graduated with third-class honours in economics. During her time at university, she became president of the Women's University Settlement, which worked to promote the welfare of women and children in deprived areas of London.

== Social work ==
In 1924, Aves became a school care organiser for London County Council, starting as an assistant care organiser. Care organisers were usually expected to hold a diploma in a social science, but Theodora Morton accepted her economics degree as a substitute. She was promoted to Principal Assistant Organiser in 1930. In 1938, she was involved in planning the evacuation of children, a role she held until 1941. She became permanent Chief Welfare Officer in the Ministry of Health in 1946, a role she had held on secondment during the Second World War, from 1941. In this role, which she held until the 1963, she supported post-war reforms of welfare and the establishment of a modern social service system. She worked on secondment for brief periods at both the United Nations Relief and Rehabilitation Administration, as chief child care consultant in Europe, and the Home Office at the start of this role.

Aves held various short-term positions in family and child welfare for the United Nations alongside her role in the Ministry for Health throughout her tenure there.

She was a governor of the National Institute for Social Work from 1961–1971, and served as chair of the National Corporation for the Care of Old People from 1965–1972. She chaired the Commission on the Role of the Voluntary Worker in the Social Services from its establishment by the National Council of Social Services in 1966. Her 1969 report on the role of volunteers in social service, The Voluntary Worker in the Social Services, led to the establishment of the Volunteer Centre. It encouraged an increase in the number of volunteers involved in health and social services, a proposal which was opposed by trade unions.

== The Volunteer Centre ==
The Volunteer Centre was established in January 1973, with future Labour MP Mike Thomas as director and Aves a founder member of its board of governors. She became vice-president in 1974. The centre "took on the role of collecting and distributing information on volunteer recruitment and training". Her work, which had been recognised in part due to the advocacy of economist Brian Abel-Smith, with the Volunteer Centre led to her becoming a Dame in 1977.

In 1975, Aves chaired an independent commission for the National Association of Voluntary Help Organisers.

== Personal life ==
Aves lived in Highgate for most of her life. She was a member of the Highgate Literary and Scientific Institution, and enjoyed birdwatching. She was baptised at the age of thirty-four, and went on to serve on the Diocese of London's Board for Social Responsibility from 1977.

She died on 23 June 1986, with a memorial service held for her on 15 October, officiated by the Bishop of Stepney.

== Honours ==
Aves was appointed an Officer of the Order of the British Empire (OBE) in the 1946 New Year Honours for her contribution to wartime social services, before being made a Commander of the Order of the British Empire (CBE) in the 1963 New Year Honours on her retirement from the Civil Service. She was made a Dame Commander of the Order of the British Empire (DBE) in the 1977 New Year Honours.
