= Emma Maitland =

British suffragist (1844–1923)

Emma Knox Maitland
- Born: Emma Knox Rees; 17 May 1844; Tenby
- Died: 13 June 1923 (aged 79); Hampstead
- Children: six

Emma Knox Maitland (17 May 1844 – 13 June 1923) was a British suffragist and educationist.

== Life ==
Maitland was born in Tenby in 1844. Her father was a JP but he died when she was young. She had six children with Frederick Maitland whom she married in 1862. He was a clerk and she took some interest in the emerging ambition for women to vote in 1866. It was said that she was not able to take a full interest in public life until her children were grown. However she applied her Liberal Party interests when she campaigned for Elizabeth Garrett Anderson to be a member of the local school board, unsuccessfully, in 1870.

She became involved with school boards and she stood herself unsuccessfully in 1888. She was part of second generation of women to get involved in school boards and she was a contemporary of Elizabeth Garrett Anderson, Annie Besant and Emily Davies.

Maitland was said to be a key member of the Women's Local Government Society which had been renamed in 1893. The aim of this society was to get women elected to local government. In 1894 she was elected to the London School Board to represent Chelsea and she took a special interest in the education offered to children who were blind or deaf. She travelled abroad to find out the latest ideas for teaching the deaf and dumb. She became responsible for nine schools and she and the Women's Local Government Society defended the rights of women to serve on the new Local Education Boards. in 1901 she was elected with three others to represent the London school boards on the Association of School Boards.

Maitland died in Hampstead in 1923.

== Legacy ==
Maitland's grandchildren included Geraldine Aves.
