= Robert Udny =

Scottish/West Indies merchant and art collector

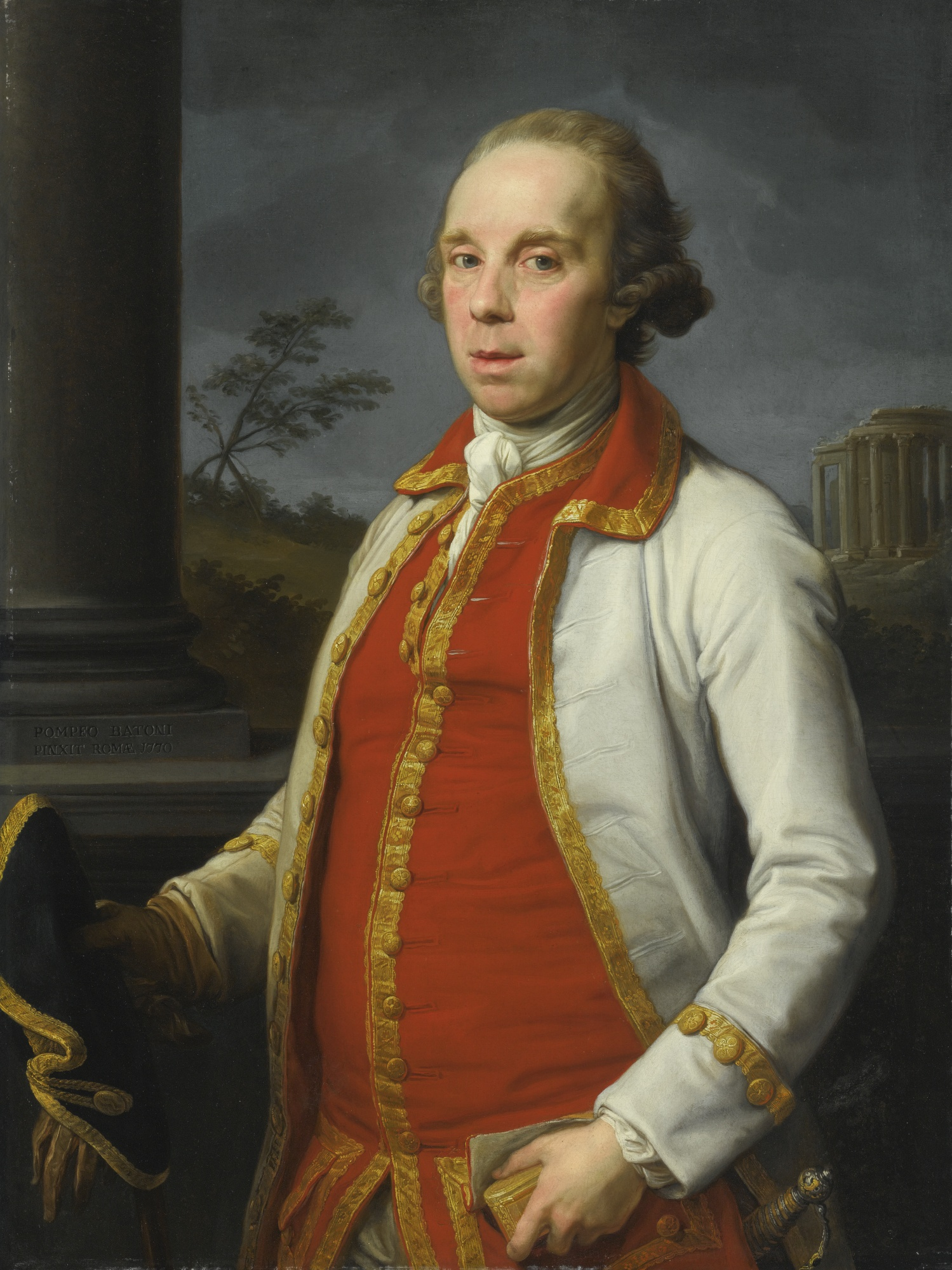
Robert Udny, portrait by Pompeo Batoni

Robert Fullarton Udny or Udney (1725–1802) was a Scottish merchant, art collector and Fellow of the Royal Society. His collection, highly reputed in its time, was broken up at a sale in 1804.

== Life ==
Udny was one of seven sons of James Udny (died 1761), an advocate in Aberdeen, and his wife Jean Walker. He became a sugar merchant, the owner of the Calivigny estate in Grenada.

In 1767, Udny was elected a Fellow of the Society of Antiquaries of London, then of Broad Street. In 1774, then of Cavendish Square, he began to buy and deal in property in Hertfordshire, with a purchase from John Hadley the younger (born 1738), son of John Hadley the astronomer. He became a Fellow of the Royal Society in 1785. He inherited property at Dudwick, Aberdeenshire in 1786 on the death of Robert Fullerton, a soldier of fortune and cousin.

Udny later bought property in the London area, starting with a house in the High Street, Teddington in 1789, which became Udny House. A picture gallery was added, involving Robert Adam. He subsequently bought a house in Mayfair. He died there, in a town house in Hertford Street.

== Art collector and patron ==
Using his brother John as agent, Udny made many purchases of Italian paintings: John Udny was a British consul for 35 years, first in Venice, and then in Livorno. Udny and his family visited Italy in 1769–1770, passing through Turin to Rome, and then went on to Venice.

Udny assisted the print collector Charles Rogers (1711–1784). He was noted in his time, not only as a collector, but also as a patron. He supported a visit in 1775 to Italy by the painter Edward Edwards. In July 1786 George Romney, John Flaxman, Jeremiah Meyer and William Hayley visited Udny's collection at Teddington. In the 1790s the Udnys were on good terms with Ozias Humphrey, though Robert took against a portrait he had painted of his wife.

The Burlington House Cartoon by Leonardo da Vinci was acquired by Udny from Italy in 1763, before passing to the Royal Academy. Before 1799, Udny had sent to Catherine the Great two other da Vinci cartoons, drawings of heads from his work The Last Supper.

== Legacy ==
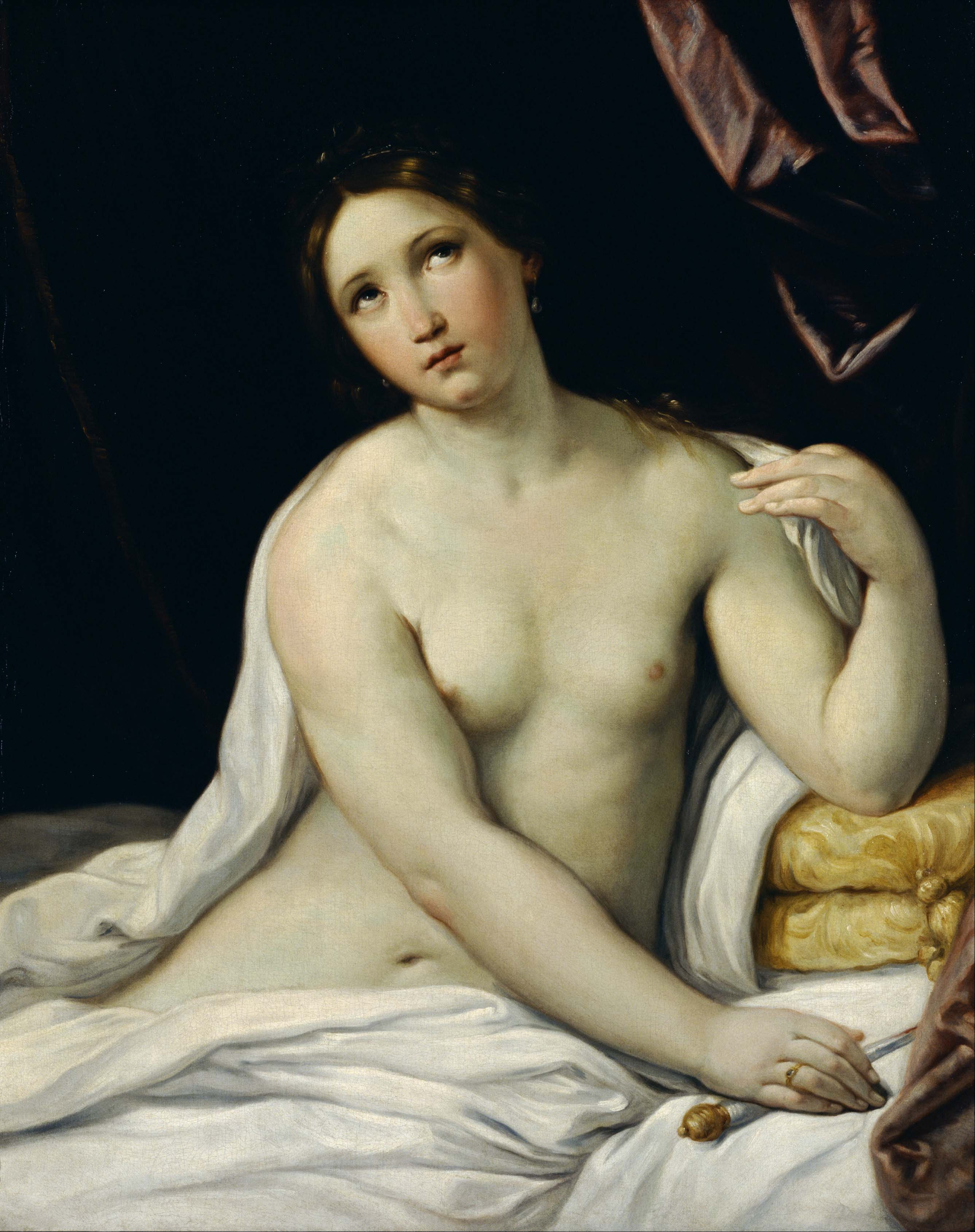
Lucretia by Guido Reni, painting from the Robert Udny Collection sold in the Christie's sale 1804, now in the National Museum of Western Art, Tokyo

After Udny died in 1802, Richard Cosway designed a memorial for him. An engraving of the design was made by Jean Condé.

Udny's heiress was his daughter, Lady Cunynghame. Having fallen out with her husband, Udny disposed his possessions in other directions. He left an interest in his estate to his nephew George Udny of the Bengal Civil Service. This was Robert George Udny (died 1830), son of his brother Ernest, who married Temperance Fleming: they were the parents of George Udny (1802–1879) the younger. The compensation for the Grenada estate under the Slavery Abolition Act 1833, of £7,972, was paid to Temperance Udny.

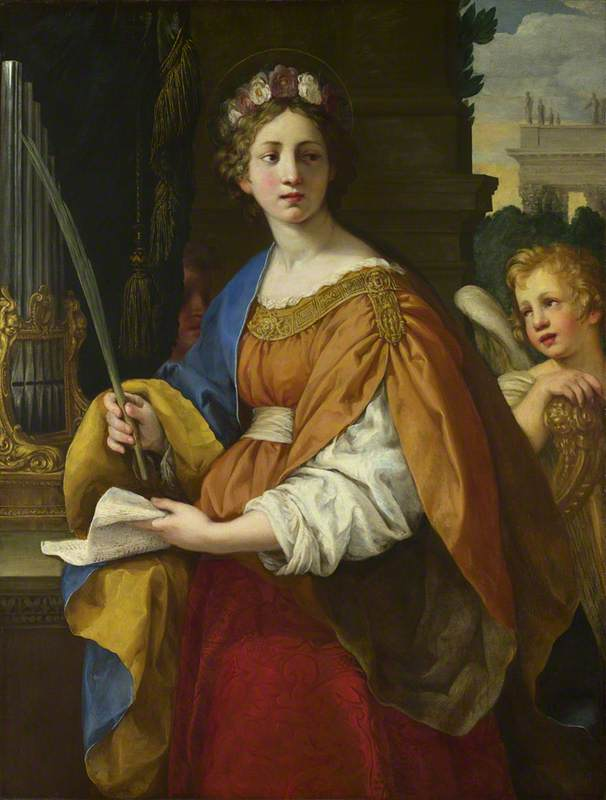
Saint Cecilia by Pietro da Cortona, now in the National Gallery, London, painting from the Robert Udny Collection sold in the Christie's sale 1804 as a Domenichino

Udny's wish, that the Royal Academy should be given a first option to purchase his collection, was respected by his executors, but no sale resulted. The art collection was disposed of in a series of five auctions, the first, in 1802, being of prints, together with prints collected by his brother John who had died in 1800. In May 1804, at the final art sale, over 200 of Udny's paintings were sold at Christie's. There followed in July a sale of furniture, sculpture and porcelain. Some unsold pictures passed to John Robert Udny, son of John Udny. The gallery at Udny House was taken down in 1825, and the house itself demolished in 1899.

== Family ==
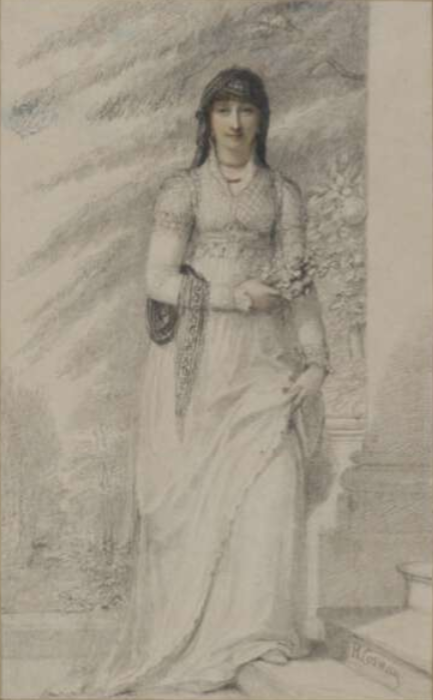
Margaret Udny, drawing by Richard Cosway c.1801, modified after Robert Udny's 1802 death

Udny married, firstly, Miss Hougham: she was sister to Ann Hougham, daughter of Culpeper Hougham, who married Spencer Compton, 8th Earl of Northampton; according to Frederick Charles Cass, her given name was Mary, and they had a daughter Jane baptised 1763. Their daughter Mary married in 1785 Sir William Cunynghame, 4th Baronet. Udny married as his second wife Margaret Jordan, known as Martha.

In 1805 Martha Udny became the teacher to Princess Charlotte of Wales, with position of Sub-Governess. She died in 1831. It was rumoured that she was the mistress of Richard Cosway: Maria Cosway, his estranged wife, believed so, as documented in a letter to Pasquale Paoli, her lover, in a collection edited by Beretti.
