= Edward Edwards (painter) =

English painter

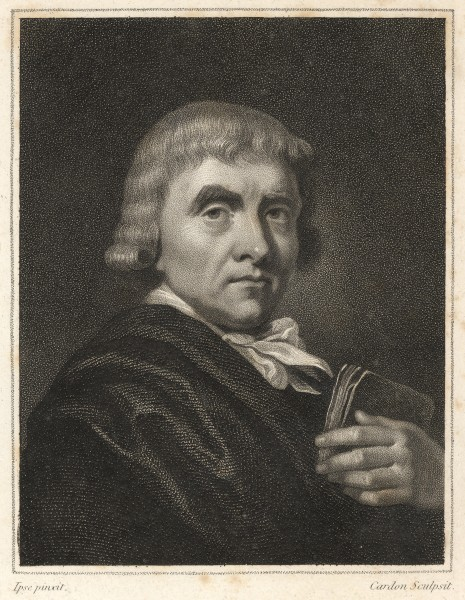
Antoine Cardon's engraving of Edwards' self-portrait from Anecdotes of Painters, London 1808 (frontispiece)

Edward Edwards ARA (7 March 1738 – 19 December 1806) was an English painter and etcher. He held the post of Professor of Perspective at the Royal Academy, and compiled a book entitled Anecdotes of Painters (1808).

== Life ==
Edwards, the elder son of a chairmaker and carver, who had come from Shrewsbury, and settled in London, was born in London 7 March 1738. He was a weak child, with distorted limbs, and remained of very small size all his life. At an early age he went to a French Protestant school, but at fifteen was removed in order to work at his father's business.

Until the age of 18 he worked with a Mr. William Hallett, cabinet maker, upholsterer, at the corner of St. Martin's Lane and Long Acre, drawing patterns for furniture. His father then sent him to a drawing school, and in 1759 he was admitted as a student into the Duke of Richmond's gallery. He lost his father in 1760, when the support of his mother and sister devolved upon him. Edwards took lodgings in Compton Street, Soho, and opened an evening school for drawing.

He lost his mother in 1800, but continued to support his sister until his death, at the age of 68. He was buried in St. Pancras churchyard.

Edwards was proficient in etching, and in 1792 published a set of 52 etchings. Some others are contained in a volume in the collection of the British Museum. He also designed numerous illustrations, wrote verses, and played the violin.

== Works ==
In 1761 he became a student in the academy in St Martin's Lane, where he studied from the life. In 1763 he was employed by John Boydell to make drawings for engravings, and in 1764 succeeded in gaining a premium from the Society of Arts for the best historical picture in chiaroscuro, which he exhibited at the Free Society of Artists that year, the subject being The Death of Tatius. He subsequently exhibited with the Incorporated Society of Artists, of which he became a member, quitting it, however, for the Royal Academy, where he exhibited for the first time in 1771, sending The Angel appearing to Hagar and Ishmael, and a portrait.

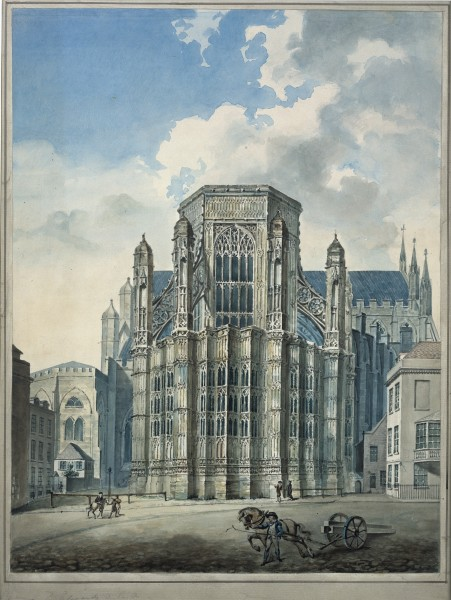
View of Henry VII's Chapel, Westminster Abbey from Old Palace Yard, 1780s

He continued to exhibit there up to the year of his death, contributing pictures of various descriptions, and numerous portraits. Among them were Bacchus and Ariadne (1773), Oliver protected by Orlando, from "As you like it" (1775), View of Brancepeth Castle, near Durham (1784), A View of the River at Barn Elms (1785), The Angel appearing to Gideon (1792), The Release of the Prisoners from Dorchester Gaol (1796), Portrait of Rev. H. Whitfield, D.D. (1799) and Cupid and Psyche (1800).

In 1773 Edwards was elected an associate of the Royal Academy. He was employed by the Society of Antiquaries to make a drawing from the picture in the royal collection of The Interview between Henry VIII and Francis I at Calais; for this drawing, which occupied him six months, he received 110 guineas. He was also employed by Lord Bessborough to repair a ceiling painted by Sir James Thornhill at Roehampton, by Mr. Bell on designs for his Shakespeare and other publications, and by Robert Udny. Udny gave him support to visit Italy, and he left for Rome in July 1775, returning in September 1776.

In 1781 he obtained a premium for landscape, and in this year he presented a paper to the Royal Society on the damage wrought by a major storm at Roehampton. In 1782 he painted three ceilings for the Hon. Charles Hamilton at Bath. About this time too he was employed a great deal by Horace Walpole at Strawberry Hill, for whom he made many drawings; in 1784, however, some disagreement led to a breach between them. In 1786 he painted for Mr. Estcourt a Hunting Party, containing portraits of the Duke of Beaufort and his sons; in the following year he was painting scenes for the theatre at Newcastle upon Tyne.

In 1788 he was appointed professor of perspective at the Royal Academy, and subsequently published a treatise on that subject. He was occupied for some time on a picture representing The Interior View of Westminster Abbey on the Commemoration of Handel, which he exhibited at the Royal Academy in 1793. In 1799 he was commissioned by Boydell to paint a scene from The Two Gentlemen of Verona for the Shakespeare Gallery.

He compiled and published a volume entitled Anecdotes of Painters (1808), intended as a supplement to Walpole's work; though rather loosely put together, it contains valuable records of contemporary artists which might otherwise have perished. A portrait engraved by Cardon after his own drawing is prefixed to the work; the original drawing, with two others by Edwards, is in the print room at the British Museum.

== Gallery ==
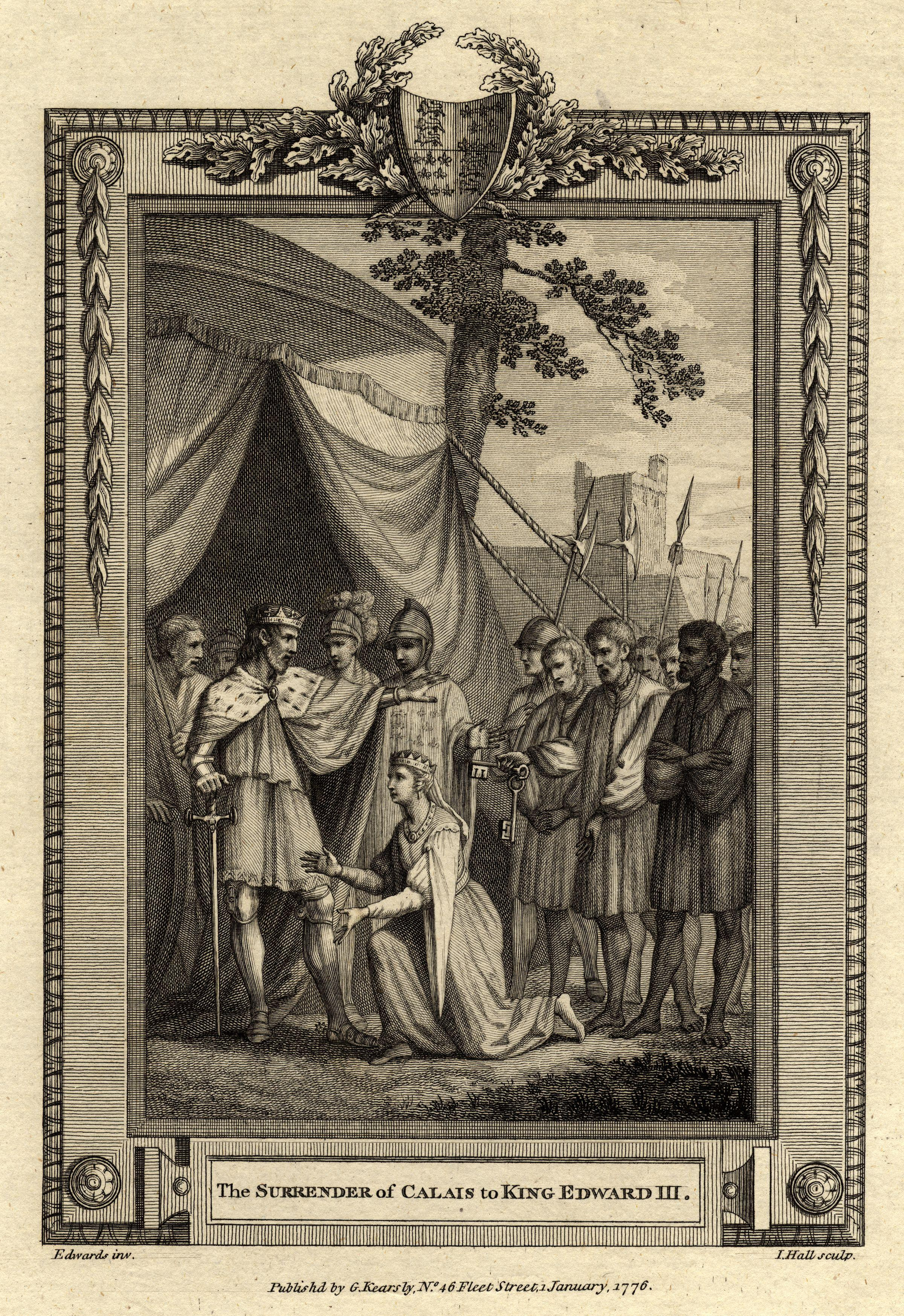
The Surrender of Calais to King Edward III (1776)

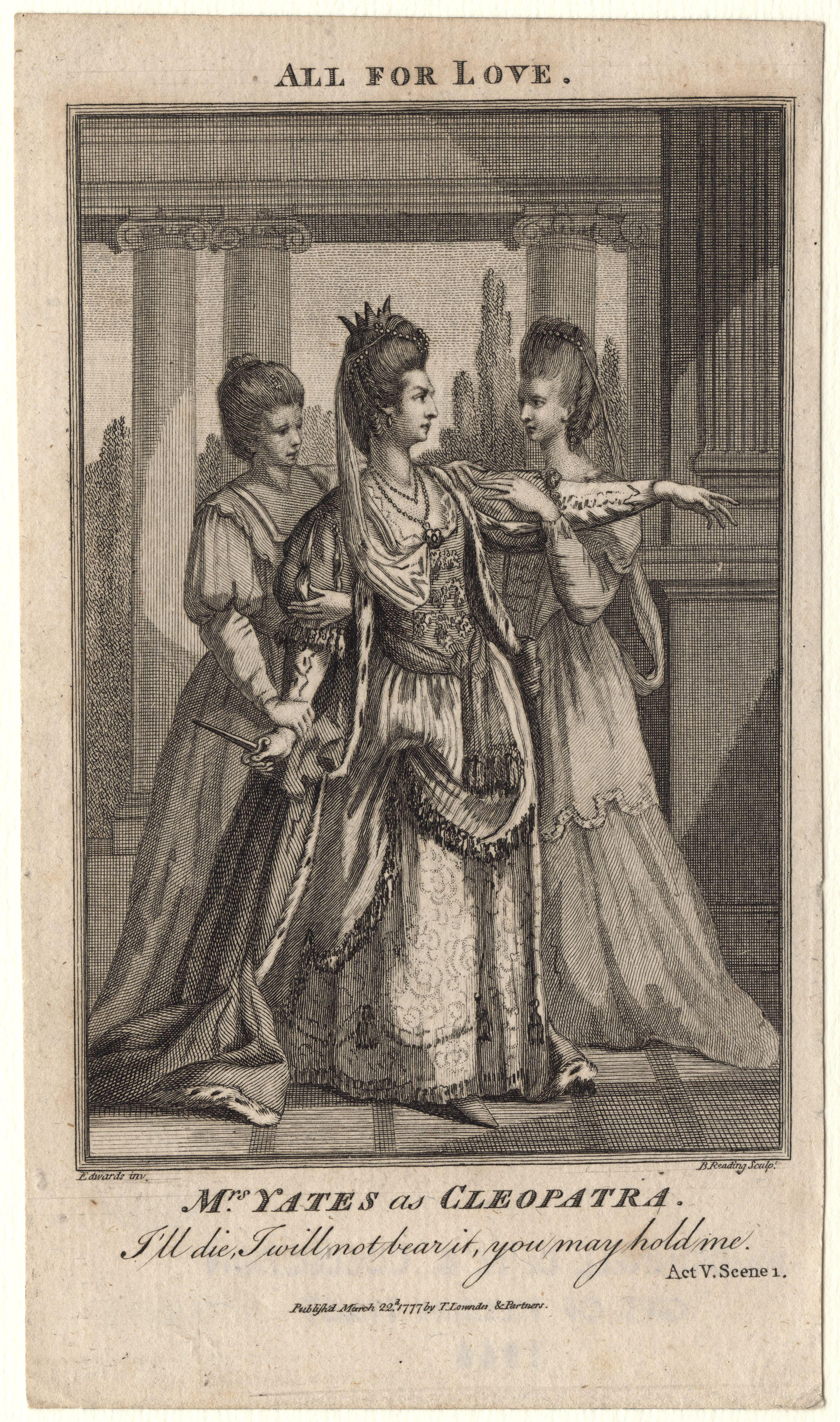
Mary Ann Yates as Cleopatra in Dryden's All for Love (1777)

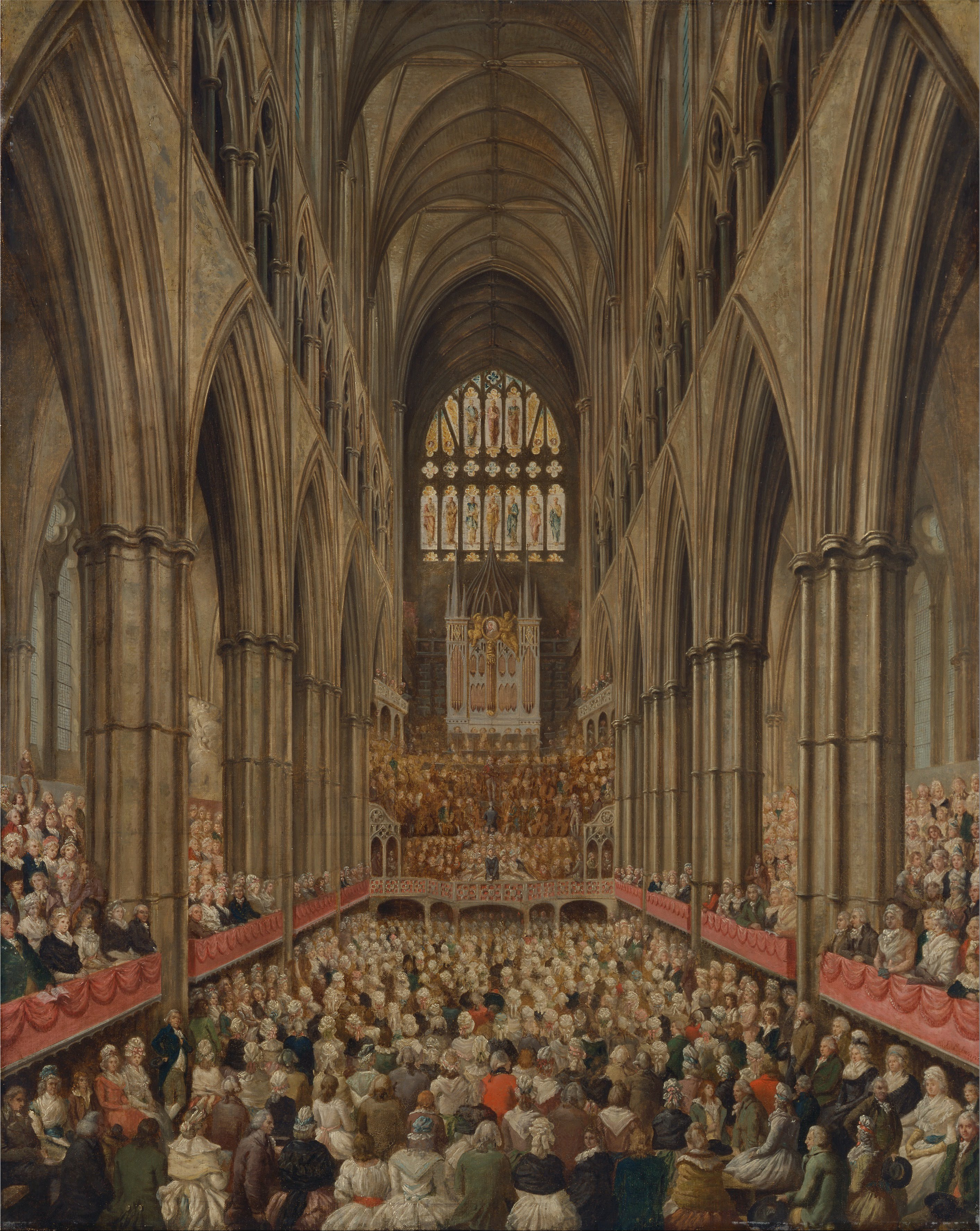
Interior View of Westminster Abbey on the Commemoration of Handel (circa 1790)
