= Richard Udny =

Sir Richard Udny, KCSI (18 July 1847 – 24 April 1923) was an official in British India, best known for his role in defining the border with the Emirate of Afghanistan. He took part in the border survey for the stretch between the Hindu Kush range in the north-east to Landi Kotal. This demarcation was the first stage in making the Durand Line of 1893 concrete in geographical terms, a process that lasted into the 20th century.

== Early life ==
He was the son of George Udny, born in Calcutta on 18 July 1847. He graduated M.A. from Aberdeen University in 1866, and matriculated at Trinity College, Cambridge in the Michaelmas term that year, at which time his father was given as of St Andrews. In 1867 he took the Imperial Civil Service examination, and was admitted to the Middle Temple.

In 1869 Udny entered the Bengal Civil Service, in which his father had worked. In 1875 he was an Assistant Commissioner in the Kohat District of the Punjab.

== The frontier and Afghanistan ==
A Pashto speaker, Udny served as political officer on British punitive expeditions, such as the Jowaki Expedition of 1877, and the operation against the Mahsud of Waziristan in 1881. From 1878 to 1882 he was Deputy Commissioner of Bannu District. He had the Kurram Valley special mission in 1888, when he negotiated with Sardar Shireendil Khan to rectify wrongs done to the Turi.

Udny was appointed Commissioner for the Peshawar Division in 1891, staying in the post until 1898. In 1891, he accompanied the Miranzai Expedition to the Samana Range, and the following year the Isazai Expedition against the Black Mountain tribes.

Udny became Commissioner for Delimitation of the Indo-Afghan Boundary, serving 1894–5 and 1896–7. In 1894 Udny and Thomas Holdich as surveyor went to the frontier at Landi Khana. There they were met by an Afghan escort, and on the way to Kabul were joined by Ghulam Haidar Khan, sipah salar to the Amir, Abdur Rahman Khan. At Jalalabad in August, a negotiation over the Mohand boundary was put into place, to save the Durand Agreement. A point in the Kunar Valley was chosen, north and east of which the originally intended line was used for demarcation. The remainder, to Landi Kotal, was left undefined.

When Udny returned to the frontier and the boundary commission survey in 1897, the situation was tense. A tribal insurgency around the Malakand Pass in July, on the British side of the new frontier, provoked a British military response under Bindon Blood, to relieve the siege of Malakand. The rising spread south to the Khyber Pass, the route to Landi Kotal. On the British side, Udny, supported by Harold Deane, believed Ghulam Haidar Khan was fomenting the tribal uprising under orders, despite denials from the Amir. Holdich was not so definite, thinking from personal knowledge that Ghulam Haidar Khan's motivations were more religious than political. William Lee-Warner tended to agree with Udny.

The Mohmand campaign of 1897–98 was already under way. On 18 August Udny ordered Captain William Barton, commanding the Khyber Rifles at Landi Kotal, to retreat, an incident about which a parliamentary question was later asked by Bernard Molloy.

The Viceroy of India, Victor Bruce, 9th Earl of Elgin, was less convinced of the Amir's involvement in the frontier disturbances. Udny and Sir William Cuningham, however, had intelligence reports in September of covert support from the Afghan regular forces to the Afridi insurgents who were in arms by late August.

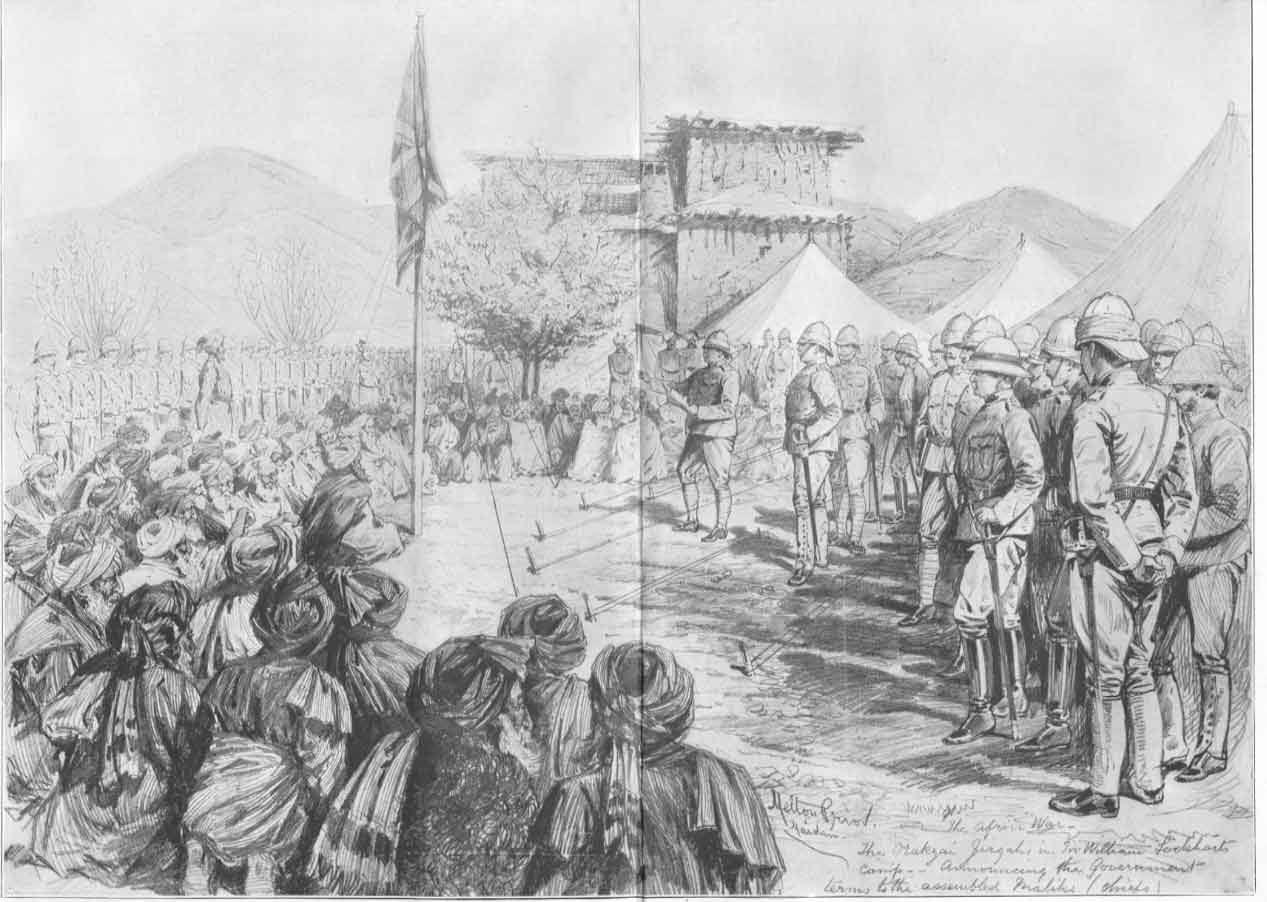
Meeting of Orakzai chiefs with British forces, November 1897, at Maidan, an occasion on which Udny interpreted

Udny acted as Pashto interpreter for Sir William Lockhart. He was chief of the political staff, which included also Robert Warburton, for the subsequent Tirah campaign.

== Later life ==
Udny retired in 1899. He died on 24 April 1923 at St Helier, Jersey. The Illustrated London News called him "a great frontier officer".

== Awards and honours ==
Udny became a Companion of the Order of the Star of India in 1894, and a Knight Commander of the Order in 1897.

== Family ==
Udny was twice married, firstly, in 1883, to Alice Tomkins (died 1904), daughter of Samuel Tomkins, a London banker, and sister of William Percival Tomkins of the Royal Engineers. His second wife, from 1917, was Edith Phyllis Davies, daughter of William Davies of Liverpool. He had one daughter with Edith, (Anne) Patricia, born in 1918.
