= Cornelia Elgood =

British physician (1874–1960)

Cornelia Bonté Sheldon Elgood
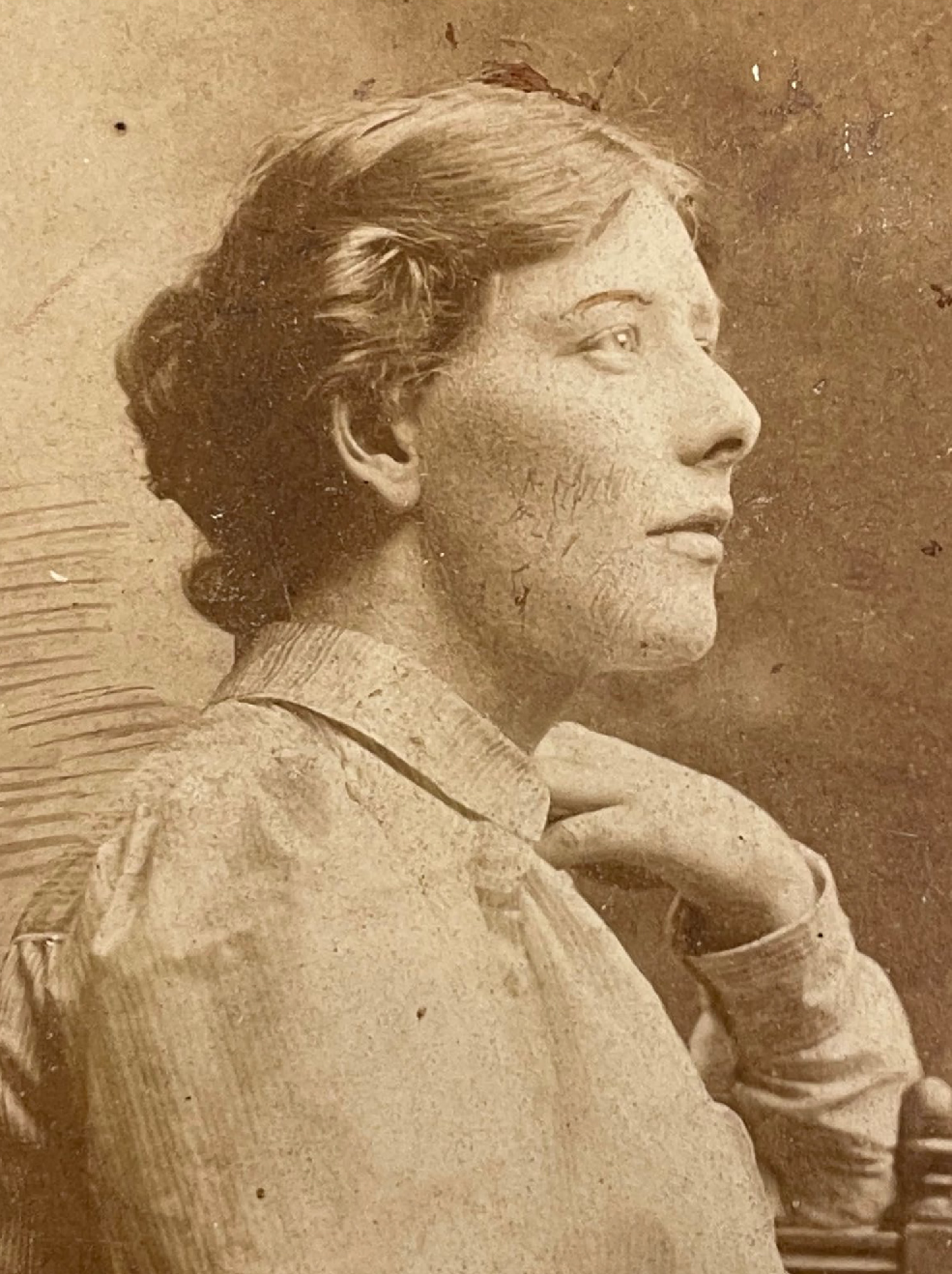
- Elgood at age 25
- Born: 1874
- Died: 21 November 1960 (aged 85–86); London, England
- Education: University of London (MD)
- Spouse: Major Percy Elgood
- Awards: Order of the Nile; CBE
- Scientific career
- Fields: Medicine
- Workplaces: International Quarantine Board of Egypt

Cornelia Bonté Sheldon Elgood (née Amos; 1874 – 21 November 1960), also known simply as Bonté Elgood, was a British physician who helped to build the Egyptian public health system and educate Egyptian girls.

== Life ==
Cornelia Bonté Sheldon Elgood was born in 1874. Her father was a judge in Egypt and her brother was Sir Maurice Amos. She was awarded her M.D. degree by the University of London in 1900 and then was appointed to the International Quarantine Board of Egypt, the first female doctor to be appointed to the board, where she became an assistant medical officer and remained until 1902.

That year Elgood opened an outpatient clinic for women and children in addition to establishing a private practice. In 1906 she moved to Cairo, Egypt's capital, and married Major Percy Elgood the following year. There she was tasked to develop and expand a program to educate girls by the Ministry of Education. The program was very successful, starting with 600 students in 3 schools, it had 20,000 students in 106 schools by 1923. Elgood also served on the Countess of Cromer's commission to establish the first free children's dispensaries in Egypt in which many Egyptian women were trained as midwives. She also sponsored Egyptian women to study medicine in Britain and served on the board of the Victoria Hospital, Cairo. Elgood remained in Egypt until forced to leave during the Suez Crisis in 1956 and lived in London until her death on 21 November 1960. She was awarded the Order of the Nile in 1921 and the CBE in 1939.
