= Sarah Amos =

English political activist (1841–1908)

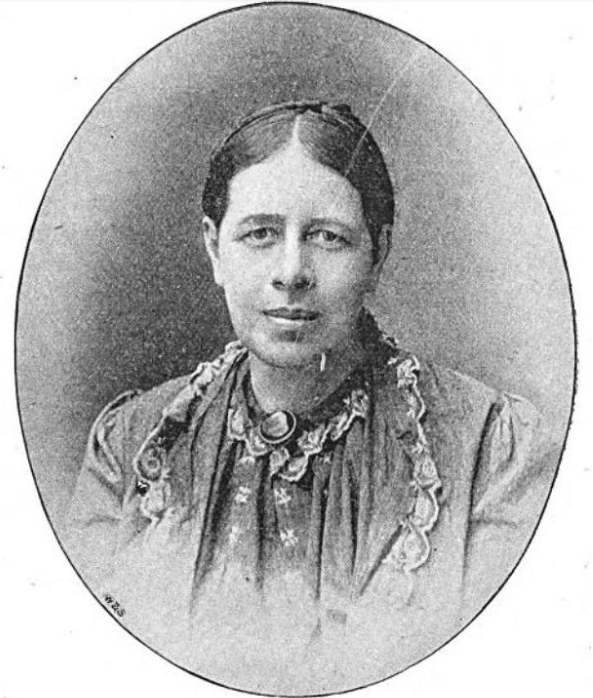
- Amos in 1895
- Born: Sarah Maclardie Bunting; 22 March 1841; Ratcliffe, near Manchester, England
- Died: 21 January 1908 (aged 66); Cairo, Egypt
- Occupations: Political activist; superintendent
- Spouse: Sheldon Amos (m. 1870; died 1886)
- Children: Maurice Amos; Bonté Elgood
- Relatives: Percy Bunting (brother); Jabez Bunting (grandfather)

Sarah Maclardie Amos (née Bunting; 22 March 1841 – 21 January 1908) was an English political activist and superintendent of the Working Women's College in Queen Square, London. She was involved in Liberal Nonconformist politics, campaigns against the Contagious Diseases Acts, and the movement to secure women's eligibility for local government office.

== Biography ==
Amos was born Sarah Maclardie Bunting at Ratcliffe, near Manchester, in 1840. She was the daughter of Thomas Percival Bunting, a solicitor and the third son of Jabez Bunting, and Eliza Bunting (née Bealey). She had three siblings: Mary, Eliza, and Percy, who later edited the Contemporary Review. In 1865, Amos became superintendent of the Working Women's College in Queen Square, London. The college had been founded in 1864 by Elizabeth Malleson to provide education for working women.

Amos married Sheldon Amos in 1870. He was a professor of law at University College London. Although the family had a secure income, they lived in the poorer district near Red Lion Square before moving to New Barnet. Their son, Maurice Amos, was born in 1872, and their daughter, Bonté, was born in 1874.

Sarah and Sheldon Amos were active in Liberal Nonconformist politics and in movements concerned with the position of women. They opposed legislation that further criminalised prostitutes and campaigned against the Contagious Diseases Acts.

In 1880, the Amos family left Britain for Australia in the hope of improving Sheldon's health. They disliked Australia and later stopped in Egypt while intending to return to England. Sheldon was offered work assisting Lord Dufferin with legal matters, and the family remained in Egypt until his death in 1886.

In November 1888, Amos hosted the first meeting of the Society for Promoting the Return of Women as County Councillors at her home. The society later became the Women's Local Government Society. The meeting included several of her relatives and was led by Annie Leigh Browne, with discussion of suitable women candidates for election.

On the formation of the Women's Vegetarian Union in 1895, Amos served as a vice-president.

Amos died in Cairo on 21 January 1908, while staying with her son.
