= Sir William Cunynghame, 4th Baronet =

Scottish politician

Sir William Augustus Cunynghame of Livingstone, 4th Baronet of Milncraig (1747–1828) was a Scottish politician who sat in the House of Commons of Great Britain from 1774 to 1790.

== Early life ==
Cunynghame was the only surviving son of Sir David Cunynghame, 3rd Baronet, and his wife Lady Mary Montgomerie, daughter of Alexander Montgomerie, 9th Earl of Eglinton, and was born on 19 April 1747. He matriculated at Christ Church, Oxford on 6 December 1766. After he succeeded his father in the baronetcy on 10 October 1767, he undertook a Grand Tour. His first wife was Frances Myreton daughter of Sir Robert Myreton, 2nd Baronet, whom he married on 21 October 1768. Frances later died on 14 November 1771. He went abroad for three years to Italy, Paris and Vienna.

== Political career ==
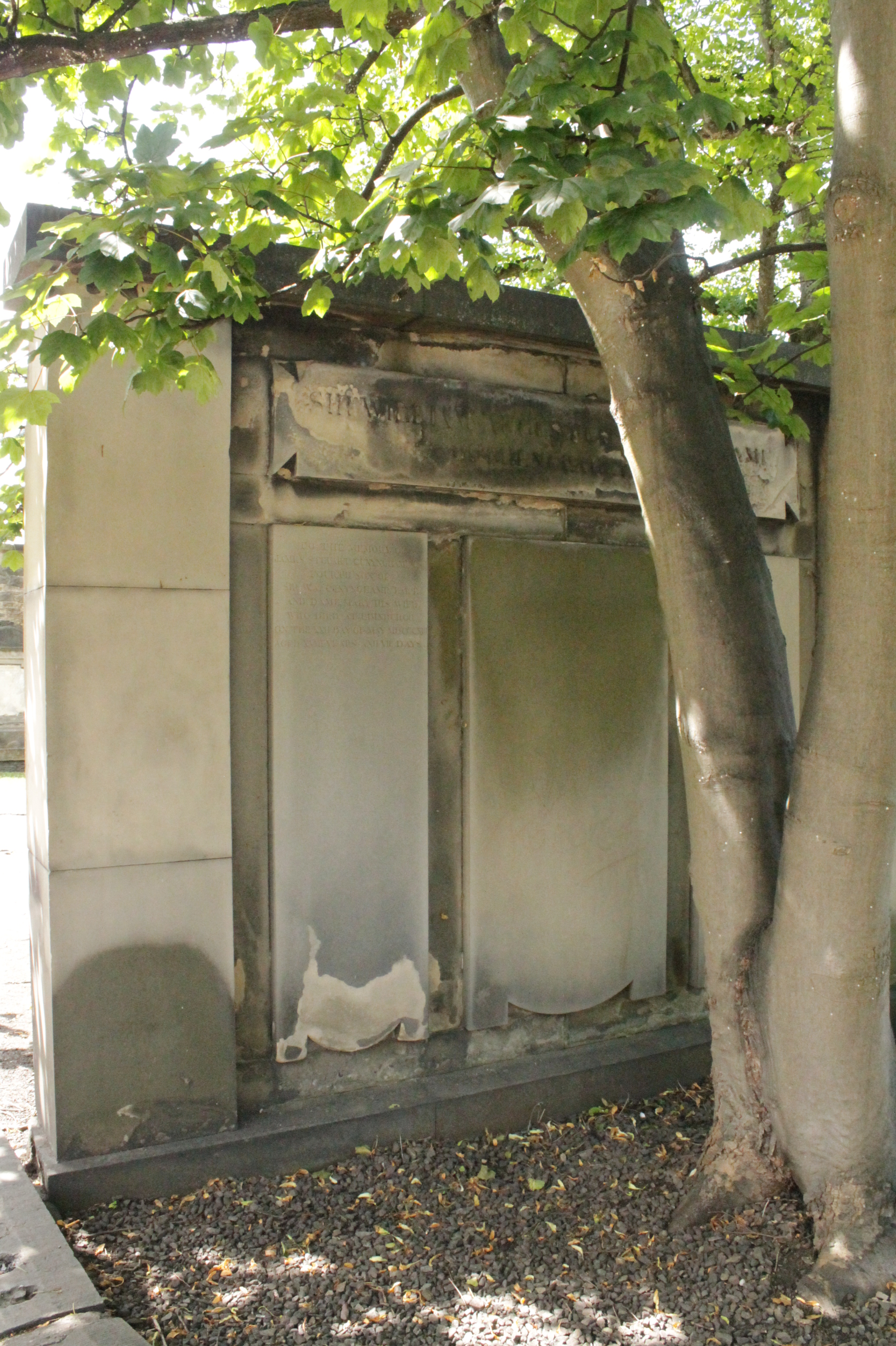
The grave of Sir William Augustus Cunynghame, Greyfriars Churchyard

At the 1774 general election, Cunynghame was returned as Member of Parliament for Linlithgowshire with the agreement of the Hopetoun interest. In June 1779, he was appointed Clerk of the Green Cloth and held the post until March 1782. He was re-elected as MP for Linlithgowshire in 1780 and 1784. He made a second marriage to Mary Udney, daughter of Robert Udney of Udney, Aberdeen on 22 June 1785. In parliament and outside, he campaigned strongly for Scottish interests. He was defeated in the 1790 general election and did not re-enter Parliament

== Later life and legacy ==
Cunynghame was receiver of the land tax in Scotland from June 1806 to March 1807. He died on 17 January 1828 and was succeeded by his son David. He had two other sons by his first wife, and four sons and three daughters by his second wife. He is buried in the western extension of Greyfriars Kirkyard in central Edinburgh.

Parliament of Great Britain
Preceded by James Dundas	Member of Parliament for Linlithgowshire; 1774–1790	Succeeded by John Hope
Baronetage of Nova Scotia
Preceded by David Cunynghame	Baronet (of Milncraig); 1767–1828	Succeeded by David Cunynghame
