= Charles Mallet =

British historian and Liberal politician

- Charles Mallet in 1906

Personal details
- Born: 2 December 1862
- Died: 21 November 1947 (aged 84)
- Parent: Louisa Mallet (mother)

Sir Charles Edward Mallet (2 December 1862 – 21 November 1947), was a British historian and Liberal politician. He was knighted in 1917.

== Life ==
He was the only son of the activist Louisa (born Udny) and Charles Mallet, a civil servant. He was educated at Balliol College, Oxford, and was admitted to Middle Temple on 21 May 1886. He was Called to the Bar on 3 July 1889.

He first stood for parliament at the 1900 General Election when he was the unsuccessful Liberal candidate for the Conservative seat of Salford West. Mallet was returned to Parliament for Plymouth in 1906.

In 1908 he was appointed as Parliamentary Private Secretary to Walter Runciman who was President of the Board of Education. In February 1910 Asquith was considering him as a possible Chief Whip but was dissuaded by the outgoing Chief Whip Jack Pease who felt he was out of sympathy with many leading Liberals over the Lords.

In March 1910 Prime Minister H. H. Asquith appointed him Financial Secretary to the War Office, a position he held until he was defeated in the December general election of the same year. He sought a return to parliament at the 1917 Salford North by-election as a Coalition Liberal candidate but was defeated by an Independent Labour candidate. He did not contest the 1918 General Election. He was Honorary Secretary of the Free Trade Union.

He became a supporter of the official Liberal party that opposed the Coalition Government. He sought to make a return to parliament standing as Liberal candidate for South Aberdeen, in 1922 without success.

General election 1922: Aberdeen South
Party	Candidate	Votes	%	±%
Unionist	Frederick Thomson	13,208	58.0	
Liberal	Charles Mallet	9,573	42.0	

He tried again in 1923 without success.

General election 1923: Aberdeen South
Party	Candidate	Votes	%	±%
Unionist	Frederick Thomson	11,258	47.3	−10.7
Labour	John Paton	6,911	29.0	n/a
Liberal	Charles Mallet	5,641	23.7	−18.3

He had published two works on Liberal politicians; Mr Lloyd George, a Study (1930) and Herbert Gladstone, a Memoir (1932).

His book on Lloyd George was entirely devoted to the shortcomings of the Liberal Leader.

== Links ==
- Leigh Rayment's Historical List of MPs
- Hansard 1803–2005: contributions in Parliament by Charles Mallet

Parliament of the United Kingdom
Preceded by Ivor Guest and Henry Duke	Member of Parliament for Plymouth; 1906–Dec. 1910; With: Thomas Dobson 1906–1910; Aneurin Williams 1910	Succeeded by Waldorf Astor and Arthur Benn
Political offices
Preceded by Francis Dyke Acland	Financial Secretary to the War Office; 1910–1911	Succeeded by Francis Dyke Acland
