= Rev. John Thomas =

The Reverend John Thomas (1871–1921) was a Wesleyan Methodist Church minister, schoolmaster and community leader in the province of Natal (now Kwa-Zulu Natal), South Africa. The World Methodist Historical Society notes that Rev. Thomas was the very first East Indian minister to ever be ordained in South Africa, and probably the first ever non-white ordination, since it was standard practice for both the Anglican and Roman Catholic sects to import all Indian ministers from India. According to the Rev. S. H. Stott, in his autobiographical work, 'A Nonagenarian's Experiences and Observations in Many Lands.' (London: Epworth Press 1927), Rev. John Thomas is noted for his single-handed translation of the Bible into the Dravidian Tamil language and Telugu language which was an essential element for the growth of Christianity in the South African Indian community.

He is also noted for his extensive missionary work; educational contributions; social responsibility; conflict resolutions and community service, provided at a pivotal and dangerous time for Indians in Natal.

His school, one of very few formal educational facilities available at that time for Indian pupils, taught a curriculum of both religious and secular education and was inclusive of both Christian and non-Christian pupils; Black and mixed race children, then called Coloured. Thus, he is credited by his superiors, peers and notable pupils, for greatly advancing not only the education, but the successful identity, community growth, and cultural life of the non-Christian and Christian East Indian populace in the province of Natal. He can thus, also be credited for heavily influencing and motivating the young Indian minds of various faiths, who went on to acquire acclaim within the non-violent anti-Apartheid Movement; and national business, political and cultural arenas. Today, the South African Indian community is the largest outside of India.

== Early life ==
Rev. John Thomas was born in Madras, India, in 1871.

== Immigration to South Africa ==
Rev. Thomas and his wife, Grace emigrated to Natal, South Africa in 1890. Conditions in India during this time were vastly deteriorated due to a combination of life-threatening factors which included growing tensions between various religions; the worsening caste system; slow recovery from the Great Famine of 1876–78; and the natural disaster phenomena known as monsoon droughts which was threatening a whole new outbreak of widespread famine which eventually did occur, resulting the deaths of many millions of Indians.

== Early-20th century education in South Africa ==
During his time as a teacher at St. Pauls, and Anglican school, worked hard to integrate himself but also to bring Indian influences to South Africa for the local Indian populace. He thus played an important role as the first minister to translate English sermons into the Tamil language.

Barred from the well-funded white schools, and with formal Black education being largely non-existent until the controversial Bantu Education Act, 1953, the growing population of school age Indian children in Natal had very few schools available to them at that time. Some of the reasoning for this can be found in the fears expressed a few years later in 1925, by leading proponents of the Apartheid ideology and their proposal of an ethnic cleansing of the Indian population via forced emigration from South Africa.

In 1925 D.F. Malan, the Minister of the Interior, stated in parliament:

... the Indian, as a race in this country, is an alien element in the population. . . .' Furthermore, '. . . no solution of this question will be acceptable to this country until it results in a very considerable reduction of the Indian population in this country.

This statement indicates the Nationalist party policy but it also found acceptance by the South African Party, the major opposition party, whose own policy towards Asiatics was defined as 'no Asiatic immigration, and repatriation as fast as possible ... with no chance of return.'

In 1921 87,6% of the Union's total Indian population resided in Natal and they exceeded the white population there by 4 811. Natal's Indian population was confined within its borders as inter-provincial restrictions prevented their free movement across the borders. Repatriation of Indians then had special significance for Natal whites.

These statements, reflect the grave sociopolitical climate and racial tensions of the era within which Rev. Thomas performed his crucial roles as minister, schoolmaster and community leader in Kwa-Zulu Natal.

The Anti-Apartheid movement had always relied as heavily upon the social responsibility and community consciousness of the religious leaders in South Africa, most prominently the Christian, Muslim and Hindu leaders, as the Civil Rights Movement relied upon their Christian leaders in the United States. This is especially significant in the face of the unBiblical and gross misuse of Christianity by many of Apartheid's proponents and supporters to promote Apartheid ideologies and its government policies.
