= Maurice Amos =

British barrister and judge

Sir Maurice Amos KBE KC
- Amos in 1930

Cairo Native Court
- In office 1903–1906

Cairo Court of Appeal
- In office 1906; 1917 – 1913; 1922

Personal details
- Born: 15 June 1872 London
- Died: 10 June 1940 (aged 67) Ulverston
- Spouse: Lucy Scott Moncrieff
- Education: Trinity College Cambridge
- Profession: Barrister, judge

Sir Percy Maurice Maclardie Sheldon Amos KBE KC (15 June 1872 – 10 June 1940) was a British barrister, judge and legal academic who served as an Egyptian judge, advisor to the Egyptian government and Quain professor of jurisprudence.

Amos is best known for founding and contributing to the Modern Law Review. Educated at Trinity College, Cambridge, Amos was called to the Bar by the Inner Temple in May 1897. Finding that his family could not support him through his early years at the Bar he travelled to Egypt, where he was appointed a member of the Cairo Native Court and then the Court of Appeals.

After a short return to Britain in 1915 to help at the Ministry of Munitions, Amos continued to work in Egypt until the end of the British Protectorate in 1922. He returned to Britain, resuming his practice as a barrister, and in 1932 was appointed Quain professor of jurisprudence, a position he held for five years. Involved in the founding of the Modern Law Review, his death on 10 June 1940 made him the first founder to die.

== Life ==
Amos was born on 15 June 1872 to Sheldon Amos, a legal academic, and Sarah Bunting, a political activist and the Lady Superintendent of the Working Women's College. Amos was educated by his mother and private tutors in France, Germany and England, until the family travelled to Australia in 1880 due to his father's health problems. Finding the country unpleasant they set out to return to England, but while passing through Egypt Sheldon Amos was offered the position of legal advisor to Lord Dufferin, which he accepted. The family stayed there until Sheldon's death in 1886, after which they returned to Europe to travel.

In 1891, Amos matriculated to Trinity College, Cambridge to study history, before switching to moral sciences following a talk with Bertrand Russell. He was joint Secretary of the Cambridge University Liberal Club from 1892 to 1894, and one of the people he shared this role with was Russell. Gaining a first, he graduated in 1895, having won the Cobden Prize, and was called to the Bar by the Inner Temple in May 1897. Working as a conveyancing pupil in Lincoln's Inn, Amos found that the family income could not support him during his first, profitless years as a barrister, and applied to become an inspector in the Egyptian Ministry of Justice. To work in the courts there, Amos taught himself Arabic and gained the French licence en droit from the University of Paris in 1889. While working as an inspector he lectured at the Khedival School of Law in Cairo. For his work as an inspector, he was awarded the Medjidie, Fourth Class in 1900. In 1903 he was made a judge of the Cairo Native Court, and in 1906 was promoted to the Court of Appeal, where he sat for seven years until offending the British population of Cairo by acquitting an Egyptian accused of assaulting a British child. Retiring from the bench, he became Director of the Khedival School of Law in 1913, where he set up a postgraduate program. On 11 July 1906, Amos married Lucy Scott Moncrieff. The couple had two sons and three daughters; Rachel, Margaret and Janet. Their grandson, Sir Thomas Legg was born to Margaret Amos and Stuart Legg.

Amos returned to the Court of Appeal in 1915, but was forced to suspend his work when he was called back to Britain to work for the Ministry of Munitions. Thanks to his fluent French he was much in demand, serving as the liaison officer to the French military mission in London and accompanying Arthur Balfour in his trip to the United States. In 1917 he returned to Egypt, where he acted as the Judicial Adviser to the Government of Egypt. He was awarded the Order of the Nile, Second Class in 1918. When the British protectorate ended in 1922, Amos helped draft the new Egyptian constitution and was appointed Knight Commander of the Order of the British Empire on 15 March 1922. He was also promoted to Grand Cordon of the Order of the Nile.

Returning to England in 1925, Amos took up his practice as a barrister again and received many briefs from the British government, particularly cases brought under the Treaty of Lausanne. In 1929 he stood for the Liberal Party at the general election in the constituency of Cambridge but was unsuccessful. In 1932 he was made a King's Counsel, and became Quain professor of jurisprudence at University College London (UCL). Both his father and grandfather were legal academics at UCL, and with this appointment Amos became the third family member in a row to work there. He quickly distinguished himself, and was elected Dean of the Faculty of Law soon after his appointment. He wrote several textbooks and was one of the founders of the Modern Law Review, and the first to die. Following his retirement in 1937 he continued writing until his death at home on 10 June 1940.

== Writings ==
- The English Constitution (1930)
- Introduction to French Law (1935)
- Lectures on the American Constitution (1938)
- British Justice (1940)

== Bibliography ==
- H. A. H. (1941). "Sir Maurice Sheldon Amos, K.B.E., K.C.". Cambridge Law Journal. 7 (3). Cambridge University Press. ISSN 0008-1973.
- R. S. T. C. (1940). "Sir Maurice Sheldon Amos, K. C.". Modern Law Review. 4 (2). ISSN 0026-7961.
