= Samuel Tomkins =

English banker and Freemason

- Born: 1810; London, United Kingdom
- Died: July 21, 1878; London, United Kingdom
- Occupation: Banker
- Spouse: Jane Walker Leith
- Children: 8

Samuel Tomkins (1810–1878) was an English private banker, known for his part in the final years of Willis, Percival & Co.; and also as a Freemason and art collector.

== Background and life ==
He was the son of Samuel Tomkins the elder (died 1849, aged 87) of Russell Square and Willis, Percival & Co., and his wife Eliza Alicia Isabella Smith (died 1856 at age 79), daughter of the Irish naval officer Edward Tyrrell Smith and his first wife Maria Nevin. Maria was from New Hampshire, and an evangelical follower of John Newton.

One of his brothers was the medical man John Newton Tomkins (1812–1876), who became resident surgeon at the National Vaccine Establishment, Russell Place, Fitzroy Square; Mary Jane Tomkins, a sister, was a poet and wrote for Household Words, married Gustave Plarr from Alsace, and was mother of Victor Plarr.

Tomkins was involved in a legal case Brooks v MaCdonnell of Willis, Percival & Co. in 1835. He was listed as a partner by 1845, then of Albert Road, Regent's Park. He was treasurer of the Magdalen Hospital, from 1862 to 1878.

The failure of Willis, Percival & Co. was announced on 1 March 1878. The liquidation of the bank by Turquand, Youngs & Co. came to a head at a creditors' meeting in April 1878, at which the estates of the three partners were put toward's the bank's liabilities, £4000 for household furniture being foregone. Christie, Manson & Woods put up for sale the picture collection of Samuel Tomkins on 29 June 1878. It included works by Murillo, Rembrandt and Carlo Dolce.

Samuel Tomkins died on 21 July 1878, leaving estate under £2000 to his widow and eldest son.

== Willis, Percival & Co. ==
Willis, Percival & Co., which over time traded under numerous names, was a Lombard Street bank with origins in a goldsmith Thomas Williams of the 17th century, at the sign of The Crown. Around 1708, it was Tudman & Child, involving Benjamin Tudman and Stephen Child of Child & Co. Its previous name, from 1778 to 1814, was Willis, Wood & Co. In the 19th century it was one of the London clearing house firms.

Richard Percival, a partner and book collector, died in 1851. The bank weathered the panic of 1857; but with hindsight it was considered to have suffered longer-term damage, through its trading connections with Greece.

In the 1860s the bank was controlled by two families: Henry Willis senior and his eldest son Henry Willis junior; with Samuel Tomkins and his eldest son Samuel Leith Tomkins. There was another partner, Henry Blanshard.

=== Final years ===
Henry Willis senior, noted for his stable of horses, who had moved to Brighton, died in November 1876. The partners were reduced to Tomkins and his son, and Henry Willis the younger. The Banker's Magazine in April 1878 took the view that the death of Willis was a negative for the bank, and with liabilities of £650,000 it might then have been wound up. A commentator in The Accountant in March had opined that the probate valuation of Willis's estate was low, indicating problems at the bank.

The bank was brought down in January 1878 by the collapse of Gerussi Brothers & Co. They were merchants based in Patras and Finsbury Park, London, importers of Mediterranean fruit. When they stopped payment, they owed the bank £238,000. The loan had been taken out some 12 years earlier, and it was considered that the bank had propped up Gerussi Bros., to its own detriment.

The failure of the bank was seen at the time, by John Biddulph Martin, to reflect badly on the traditional private banking sector. David Kynaston considers it one of two key events of 1878, a watershed year in the transition to modern banking, the other being the failure of the City of Glasgow Bank. Collins has argued that "1878 was a crisis year for the banking sector in the whole of Britain, not just in Scotland."

=== Aftermath ===
Willis, Percival & Co. were taken over by the Hampshire and North Wilts Banking Company, with creditors being paid at 45%. Hampshire and North Wilts were interested in joining the clearing house system, but as a joint-stock company had initially encountered resistance from the private bankers. After a change of name to Capital and Counties Bank, they succeeded shortly. Henry Willis junior and Samuel Leith Tomkins became managers of the new Lombard Street bank.

Investigation by the liquidator showed that a clerk for the bank, John Dawson Shepherd, had embezzled over £7,000, as was discovered in March 1877. It was argued in court that Samuel Tomkins had been reluctant to prosecute Shepherd. Another case arising from the liquidation, Rivaz v Gerussi, is a leading case on disclosure of material facts in insurance matters.

In the early 1850s, Tomkins became Grand Treasurer, to the Grand Lodge of England, and was re-elected annually for 25 years. He was "generally esteemed and respected" in his role as Masonic treasurer. Accounts including for the Grand Lodge and the Royal Masonic Institution for Boys in Wood Green were caught up in the bank A fund was set up to cover these losses. The balance owing to the Grand Chapter was paid from Tomkins's estate by Samuel Leith Tomkins, in February 1879.

== Family ==
Tomkins married Jane Walker Leith (died 1848, aged 37), sister of John Farley Leith; reciprocally Leith married in 1832 Tomkins's sister Alicia Anne, in 1832. The couple's children included:

- Samuel Leith Tomkins (1837–1898), the eldest son, married in 1866 Anna Bella Mary Barr, daughter of Col. Harry James Barr. In the mid-1870s he worked for the bank with the American Joseph Rodney Croskey on the issue of Paraguayan bonds.
- General William Percival Tomkins (1841–1922), Colonel-Commandant, Royal Engineers; grandfather of Edward Tomkins.
- Henry Barr Tomkins, fourth son, barrister
- Ernest Leith Tomkins
- Gordon Tomkins
- Mary Ann, married in 1863 the stockbroker William Evan Blakeway, of P. W. Thomas, Sons & Co. He disappeared, and the firm went bankrupt, in 1884, after the detection of his bank transfer frauds against the London Chartered Bank of Australia and Colonial Bank of Australasia.
- Alicia, married in 1883 Richard Udny
