= Eva McLaren =

English suffragist and writer (1852–1921)

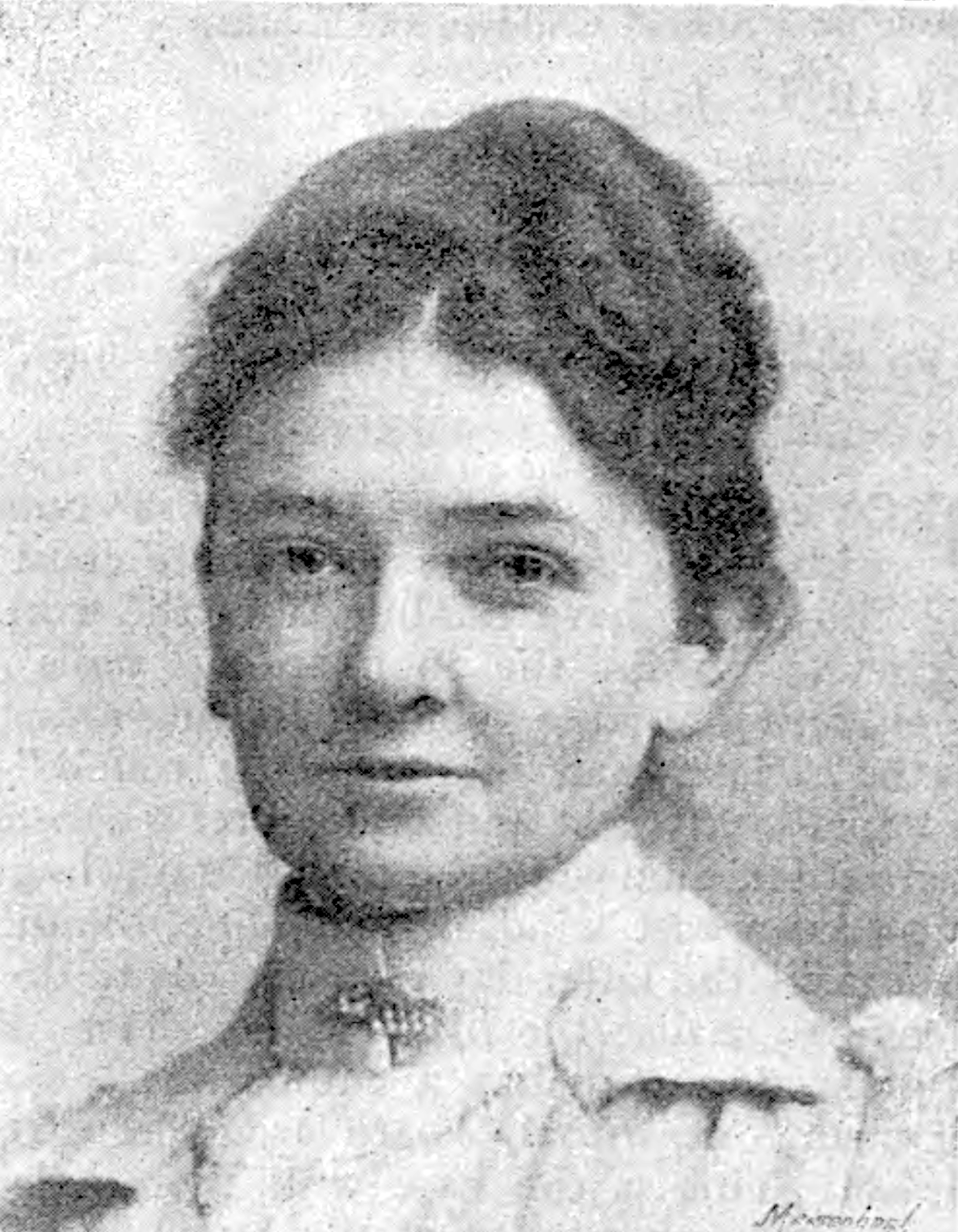
- McLaren, c. 1893
- Born: Eva Maria Müller; 1852
- Died: 16 August 1921 (aged 67–68); Platt, Kent, England
- Known for: Women's suffrage activism
- Spouse: Walter McLaren (m. 1883; died 1912)
- Relatives: Henrietta Müller (sister)

Eva Maria McLaren (née Müller; 1852 – 16 August 1921) was an English suffragist, writer and campaigner. She served as Superintendent of the Franchise department of the World's Woman's Christian Temperance Union. She was actively associated with the Women's Liberal Federation, and was the vice-president of the National British Women's Temperance Association. In this capacity, she presided over and lead the white ribbon forces in England when the President, Lady Henry Somerset, was absent from the post.

McLaren was superintendent of the department for work among municipal women voters; was an authority on parliamentary drill, as well as rules and procedure in debate; wrote leaflets on the subject of "The Duties of Women on Parish and District Councils"; and had the cause of woman's franchise greatly at heart. She was also a fine speaker. Her husband, Walter McLaren, M. P., was a nephew of John Bright and one of the chief champions of woman's cause in the British Parliament.

== Early years ==
Eva Maria Müller was born in 1852. She was the younger daughter of German businessman William Müller, and his English wife, Maria Henrietta. One of Eva's sisters, Henrietta Müller, was also a notable suffragist.

She spent her early life in Valparaíso, Chile, before the family moved to London, living in Portland Place.

She was a keen mountaineer in her youth.

== Career ==
McLaren's mother had progressive political views and introduced Eva to Octavia Hill for whom she collected rents and managed tenant welfare in Marylebone. She later trained as a nurse at Brownlow Hill infirmary in Liverpool. In 1881, she was a co-founder of Society for Promoting the Return of Women as Poor Law Guardians, a fore-runner of the Society for Promoting the Return of Women as County Councillors (1888) which eventually (1893) became the Women's Local Government Society.

On 18 April 1883, at the Meeting House in St Martin's Lane, Westminster, she married politician Walter McLaren (1853–1912), whose mother, Priscilla Bright McLaren (1815–1906), was president of the Edinburgh National Society for Women's Suffrage. Walter McLaren also supported women's suffrage and the couple joined the Manchester Society for Women's Suffrage in 1884. In the 1886 General Election, Walter McLaren was elected as the Liberal Party MP for Crewe. As one of the few MPs supporting votes for women, he served as joint secretary of the all-party committee of the Parliamentary Supporters of the Women's Franchise Bill.

McLaren joined the central committee of the National Society for Women's Suffrage, became a leading member of the Women's Liberal Federation, and was active in the Union of Practical Suffragists, the Forward Suffrage Union (which she founded in 1908 with Marie Corbett and Frances Heron Maxwell as a focus for women's suffrage efforts inside the Liberal Party and through the WLF), and the Liberal Women's Suffrage Union. She was one of the Exeter Hall speakers involved with the February 1907 Mud March; the march's concluding meeting was chaired by her husband.

McLaren wrote many pamphlets including Civil Rights of Women (published by the National Society in 1888), The Election of Women on Parish and District Councils and The Duties and Opinions of Women with Reference to Parish and District Councils (both 1894), and in 1903 she was the author of The History of the Women's Suffrage Movement in the Women's Liberal Federation.

Walter McLaren died in 1912. When World War I, broke out Eva McLaren resumed her nursing career, working at a base hospital in France during the winter of 1914–15 before being forced to return to England through ill health.

Eva McLaren was involved in the promotion of women's hockey at Great Comp Garden in Kent where she moved to in 1904 with her husband Walter. Alongside Frances Heron-Maxwell, owner of Great Comp, Eva promoted exercise for women. Eva paid for the construction of a gymnasium at Great Comp and women came to play hockey from across the county. Together, they worked to create a centre of excellence for women's sport at Great Comp Garden.

She died from chronic Bright's disease and uraemia on 16 August 1921 at Great Comp Cottage, Platt, in Kent.

== Vegetarianism ==
McLaren adopted vegetarianism in about 1889, after becoming convinced that meat did not agree with her health. A profile published in The Vegetarian on 9 December 1893 described her diet as varied and consisting largely of pulses, oil, butter and fresh vegetables, while noting that she did not abstain completely from animal products. McLaren said that vegetarianism had not interfered with her political work or her involvement in the women's suffrage movement, and that it had improved her health, energy, resistance to colds and physical strength.

== Posthumous recognition ==
Her name and picture (and those of 58 other women's suffrage supporters) are on the plinth of the statue of Millicent Fawcett in Parliament Square, London, unveiled in 2018.

On 8 August 2023 at Great Comp Garden in Kent, the trustees, alongside Sue Chandler (former England international hockey player and England captain) unveiled a portrait poster dedicated to Eva McLaren's contribution to women's hockey.
