= Women's Local Government Society =

British campaign group

The Women's Local Government Society was a British campaign group which aimed to get women into local government. Its initial focus was on county councils but its remit later covered other local government roles such as school boards.

== History ==
The organisation emerged from a local electors association formed by Amelia Charles, Caroline Biggs, Mrs Evans and Lucy Wilson at the instigation of Annie Leigh Browne. This group's ambition was to get women into church politics.

In November 1888 the Society for Promoting the Return of Women as County Councillors was formed by twelve women at Sarah Amos's house. The group included Elizabeth Lidgett and her sister Mary Bunting and it was led by Annie Leigh Browne. It was deciding suitable women candidates for election. Lidgett was offered the opportunity of standing to be a London County Councillor in 1889 but she refused.

Annie Leigh Browne provided early funding and she, Eva McLaren, the Marchioness of Aberdeen, Louisa Temple Mallett and Newnham College founder Millicent Garret Fawcett were key members. In 1893 it changed its name to the Women's Local Government Society, reflecting the members wish to encourage women to be involved in every branch of politics and not exclusively in county councils. The aim of this society was to get women elected to local government. An early victory was the election of two women, Jane Cobden and Lady Margaret Sandhurst, to the London County Council. This was possible because of the wording of the Local Government Act 1888 which did not disqualify women candidates. A later court case determined that this was a mistake. Campaigns were unsuccessfully started to reverse the court's interpretation. However, in 1894 new legislation did allow women to stand for more minor roles.

In 1894 Emma Maitland was elected to the London School Board to represent Chelsea and she took a special interest in the education offered to children who were blind or deaf. School boards were abolished by the Education Act 1902, which replaced them with local education authorities; the Women's Local Government Society defended the rights of women to serve on the new authorities, arguing this was a step backwards as they had been contributing to school boards since the 1870s. The publication of the Qualification of Women (County and Borough Councils) Act in 1907 was a victory for the Women's Local Government Society.
