= Annie Leigh Browne =

British educationist and suffragist

- Born: 14 March 1851; Bridgwater, England, United Kingdom of Great Britain and Ireland
- Died: 8 March 1936 (aged 84); London, England, United Kingdom
- Education: Queens College
- Occupations: Educator and suffragist

Annie Leigh Browne (14 March 1851 – 8 March 1936) was a British educationist and suffragist. She co-founded College Hall, London, and funded and worked to get women elected to local government.

== Life ==
Browne was born in Bridgwater in 1851. Both of her grandfathers fought at the Battle of Trafalgar. She, her parents and her sister Mary moved to Clifton near Bristol. There she was educated by tutors and governesses before her family moved to London where she attended Queens College on Harley Street for a year in 1868. That same year John Beddoe and his wife. who were both friends with Mary Carpenter. hosted what was said to be the first women's suffrage meeting at their house in 1868. Browne attended and this was the start of long commitment to the suffrage cause. The two Browne sisters also worked with Octavia Hill, and with Samuel and Henrietta Barnett at Toynbee Hall.

In 1880 she and Mary Stewart Kilgour campaigned for women's education; their work (with inputs from Mary Thomasina Browne - later Lady Lockyer - and Henrietta Müller) and Browne's money led to the opening of College Hall in Byng Place in 1882. It later (1932) moved to nearby Malet Street.

In November 1888 the "Society for Promoting the Return of Women as County Councillors" was formed by twelve women. Browne provided early funding and she, Eva McLaren, the Marchioness of Aberdeen, Louisa Temple Mallett and Newnham College founder Millicent Garret Fawcett were key members. It later (1893) became the "Women's Local Government Society," and its aim was to get women elected to local government. An early victory was the election of two women, Jane Cobden and Lady Margaret Sandhurst, to the London County Council. This was possible because of the wording of the Local Government Act 1888 which did not disqualify women candidates. A later court case determined that this was a mistake. Campaigns were unsuccessfully started to reverse the court's interpretation. However, in 1894 new legislation did allow married women to stand for school boards.

Browne was a member of the Union of Practical Suffragists' executive committee in 1898, a member of the Central Society for Women's Suffrage (and its successor, the London Society for Women's Suffrage), and in February 1907 took part in the 'Mud March' organised by the National Union of Women's Suffrage Societies.

Browne died in London in 1936 of bronchitus.
