= Bohun (surname) =

Bohun is a surname of multiple origins. In particular, the surname may be associated with the Bohun family of England during the 13th and 14th centuries. It can also be a Ukrainian surname Богун. Notable people with the surname include:

== English ==
- Damien De Bohun
- Edmund Bohun (1645–1699), English writer on history and politics
- Eleanor de Bohun (c.1366–1399), elder sister and co-heiress of Mary de Bohun
- George Bohun Martin
- Henry de Bohun, 1st Earl of Hereford (1176–1220), Norman-English nobleman
- Henry de Bohun (d. 1314), English knight killed at Bannockburn
- Hugh Bohun, a pen name of Bernard Cronin (1884–1968), author and journalist
- Humphrey de Bohun (disambiguation), multiple people
- Isabel de Bohun Lockyer (1895–1980), British painter
- John Bohun, Abbot of Bury St Edmunds, 1453–1469
- Lawrence Bohun (d. 1621), English physician and member of the Virginia Governor's Council
- Margaret de Bohun, multiple persons
- Mary de Bohun (c. 1368–1394), the first wife of King Henry IV of England and mother of King Henry V
- William de Bohun, 1st Earl of Northampton (ca. 1312 – 1360), English nobleman and military commander who won the Battle of Crécy

== Ukrainian ==
- Ivan Bohun (died 1664), a Ukrainian Cossack military leader
- Leon Bogun Mazeppa von Razumovsky, or Jacob Makohin, Ukrainian American military and public figure, philanthropist, pretender nobleman

=== Fictional characters ===
- Yuri Bohun, a fictional Cossack character in the novel With Fire and Sword (1884) by Polish writer Henryk Sienkiewicz
- Protagonist in Bohun, a novel by Jacek Komuda.

== Other ==
- Chae Bohun, spelling variant of Chae Bo-hun (born 1992), South Korean singer-songwriter
- Peter Michal Bohúň (1822–1879), Slovak painter

== See also ==
- Bogunović
- Bohunov (disambiguation)
