= Lockyer (surname) =

Lockyer is a surname. Notable people with the surname include:

- Andrew Lockyer (born 1965), Australian footballer
- Bill Lockyer (born 1941), American politician
- Bobbi Lockyer, Aboriginal Australian artist
- Charles Lockyer (died 1752), British politician
- Clifford Lockyer (born 1949), British businessman
- Dafydd Lockyer (born 1985), Welsh rugby union footballer
- Darren Lockyer (born 1977), Australian rugby league footballer
- Edmund Lockyer (1784–1860), British soldier and Australian explorer
- Edward Lockyer (1899–1958) Canadian businessman and politician
- Henry Frederick Lockyer (1797–1860), acting Governor of British Ceylon
- Herbert Lockyer (1886–1984), minister and biblical writer
- Isabel de Bohun Lockyer (1895–1980), British painter
- James E. Lockyer (born 1949), Canadian lawyer, politician
- James Lockyer (architect) (1796–1875), English architect
- James Lockyer (musician) (1883–1962), British violist
- James Lockyer (activist) (born 1949), Canadian lawyer and social justice activist
- John Lockyer, Canadian ski jumper
- Lionel Lockyer (c. 1600–1672), quack doctor
- Malcolm Lockyer (1923–1976), British film composer and conductor
- Nicholas Lockyer (public servant) (1855–1933), Australian public servant
- Nicholas Lockyer (1611–1685), English clergyman
- Nigel Lockyer (born 1952), particle physicist
- Norman Lockyer (1836–1920), English scientist and astronomer
- Paul Lockyer (1950–2011), Australian television journalist
- Peter Lockyer, American actor and singer
- Phil Lockyer (born 1946), Australian politician
- Robert Lockyer (1625–1649), English soldier
- Roger Lockyer (1927–2017), English historian
- Tarkyn Lockyer (born 1979), Australian rules footballer
- Thomas Lockyer (MP) (1699–1785), English politician
- Thomazine Mary Lockyer (1852–1943), British astronomer, suffragist, and Unitarian
- Tom Lockyer (cricketer) (1826–1869), English cricketer
- Tom Lockyer (born 1994), Welsh professional footballer
- Will Lockyer (1875–1959), British politician and trade unionist
- William James Stewart Lockyer (1868–1936), English astronomer and physicist
