= Lockyer =

Lockyer may refer to:

== Places ==
- Cape Lockyer
- Electoral district of Lockyer, Queensland, Australia
- Lockyer (lunar crater)
- Lockyer (Martian crater)
- Lockyer Creek
- Lockyer Hotel
- Lockyer Island
- Lockyer National Park
- Lockyer railway station, closed railway station on the Main Line railway in Queensland, Australia
- Lockyer Valley Region
- Lockyer Valley, Queensland
- Lockyer Waters, Queensland
- Lockyer, Queensland
- Lockyer, Western Australia

== Other uses ==
- Lockyer (surname)
- Lockyer v. Andrade, 2003 lawsuit
- Silveira v. Lockyer, 2002 lawsuit

== See also ==
- Locker (disambiguation)
