= Allman Bay =

Bay in Nunavut, Canada

- Location in Nunavut
- Location: Nares Strait
- Coordinates: 79°30′N 073°50′W
- Basin countries: Canada
- Settlements: Uninhabited

Allman Bay is an arm of Nares Strait, in the Qikiqtaaluk Region of Nunavut, Canada. It is located in eastern Ellesmere Island, southwest of the southern edge of the Darling Peninsula. Dobbin Bay is 28 km (17 mi) to the northeast. Cape Prescott is the headland to the west of the entrance.

== Exploration ==
Admiral Sir George Nares explored the bay during his voyage of 1875–1876.

During the period of August 18, 1898, through August 2, 1899, American explorer Robert Peary's ship was ice-bound in Allman Bay.
