= Bohuňov =

Bohuňov or Bohunov may refer to:

- Bohuňov (Svitavy District), a municipality and village in the Pardubice Region
- Bohuňov (Žďár nad Sázavou District), a municipality and village in the Vysočina Region
- Yaroslav Bohunov, Ukrainian professional footballer

== See also ==
- Bohun (disambiguation)
