= Kalaallit Nunaat high arctic tundra =

Ecoregion in northeastern Greenland

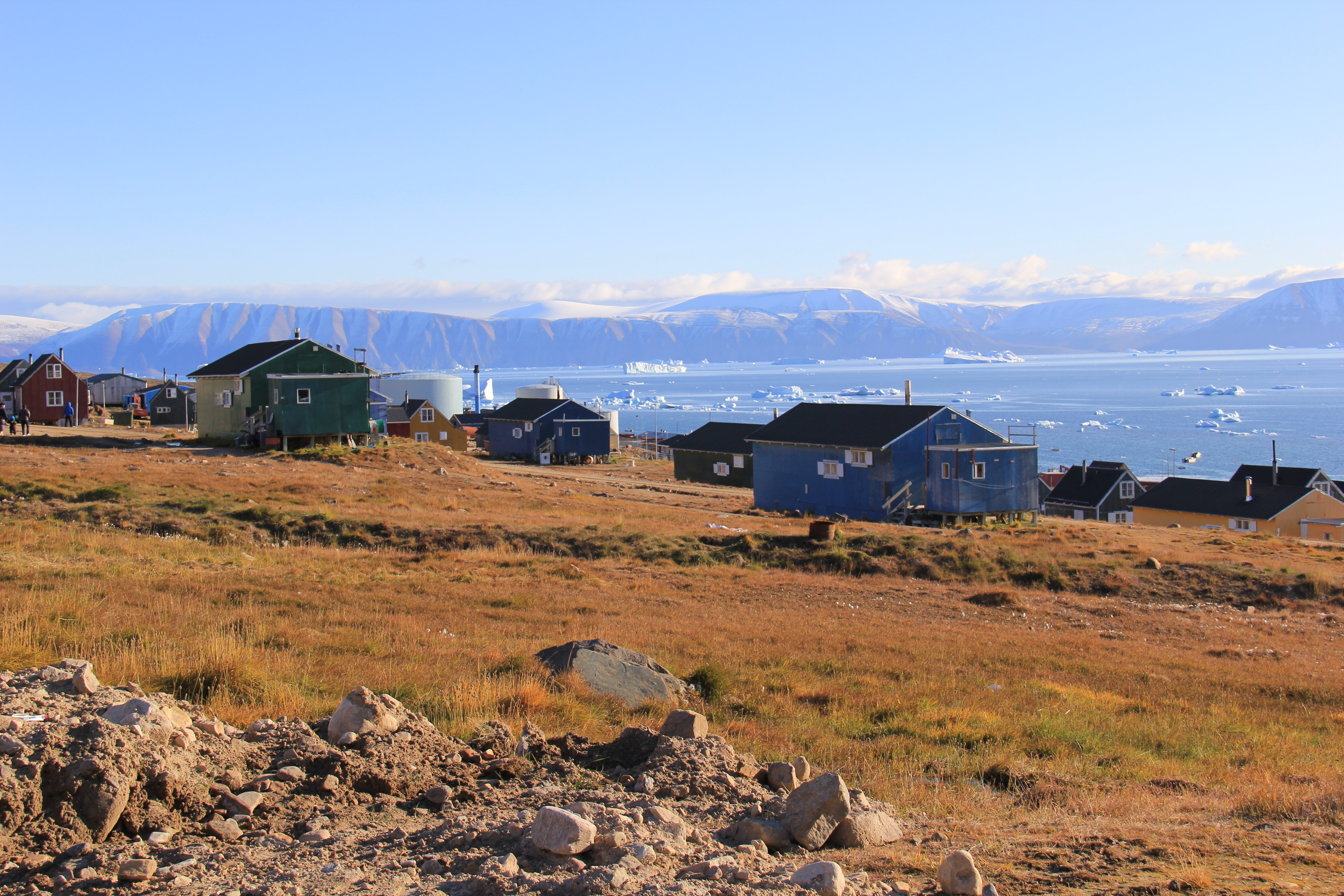
- Village of Qaanaaq, Greenland on the west coast

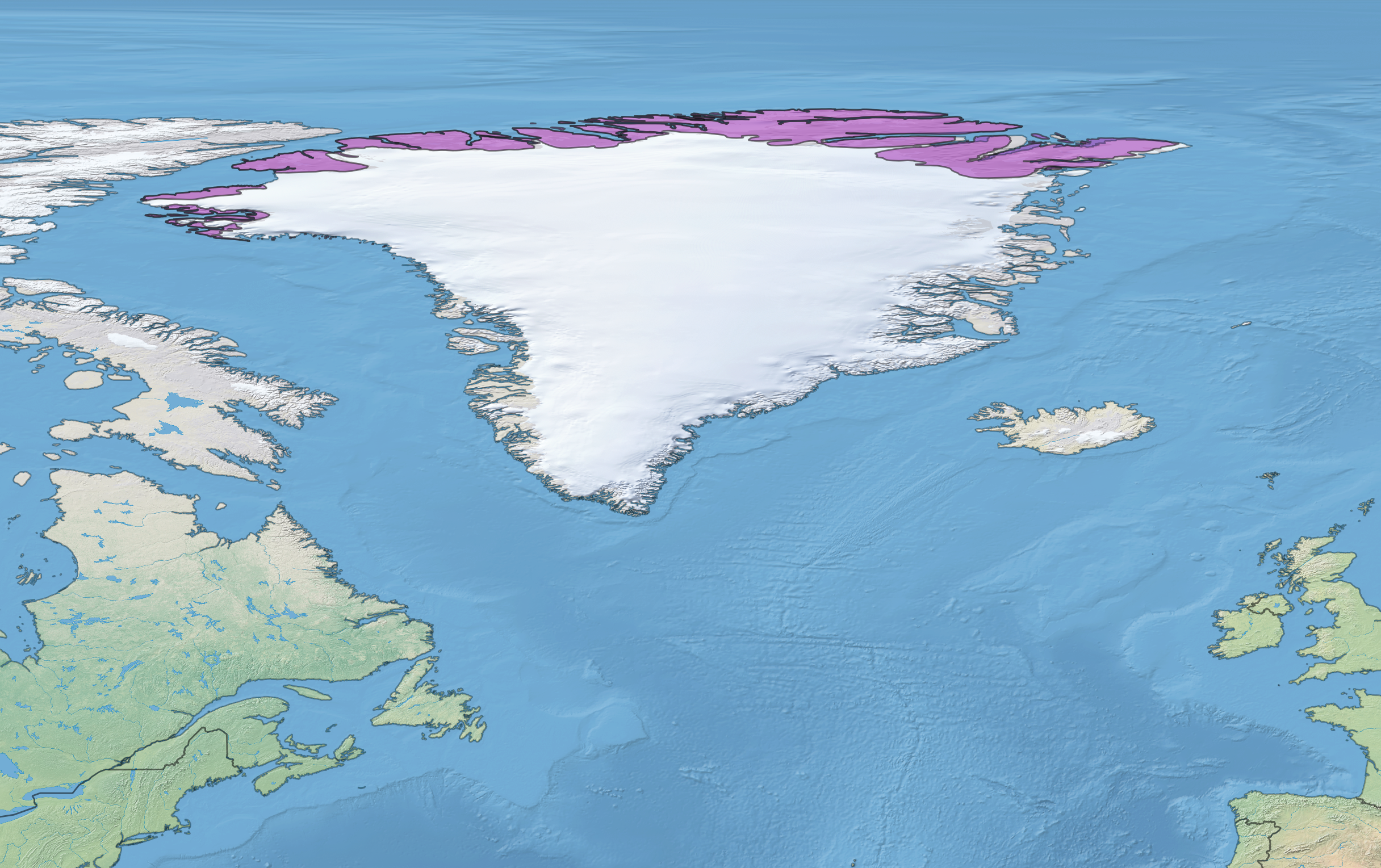
- Map of the Kalaallit Nunaat High Arctic Tundra (purple)

Ecology
- Realm: Nearctic
- Biome: Tundra
- Borders: High Arctic tundra; Kalaallit Nunaat low arctic tundra

Geography
- Area: 304,321 km^{2} (117,499 mi^{2})
- Country: Denmark
- State: Greenland
- Coordinates: 70.25°N 70.75°W

The Kalaallit Nunaat high arctic tundra ecoregion covers the coastal areas of northern including the upper half of the west coast and the upper one-third of the east coast. Greenland (called Kalaallit Nunaat in the Greenlandic language). Areas inland of this strip of land are either covered in ice or bare rock. About one-third of the region is covered by mosses and lichens, and another 3% by herbaceous vegetation and shrubs. The largest national park in the world, Northeast Greenland National Park, protects a majority of the land within the ecoregion. The Pituffik Space Base is also located in this ecoregion.

== Location and description ==
The ecoregion covers the coastal fringe of Greenland, from 75° N latitude at Melville Bay, around the northern coast to 70° N at Scoresby Bay on the east coast. The coastal bands south of this are in the Kalaallit Nunaat low arctic tundra ecoregion. The coast is rugged, although less so than the south, with deep inlets from the sea. The most ice-free of this coastal band is on the northeast, in the region of Peary Land. The lower soil is permafrost.

== Climate ==
The climate of the ecoregion is Tundra climate (Köppen climate classification ET), a local climate in which at least one month has an average temperature high enough to melt snow (0 °C (32 °F)), but no month with an average temperature in excess of 10 °C (50 °F). There is less precipitation than in the south.

== Flora and fauna ==
Plant life is sparse, with scattered fields of heath and fellfields of low herbaceous cushion plants. There are no trees. Vegetation is strongest on the east coast, with the greatest extents towards the south. Plant adaptations required to live in this harsh environment include tolerating cold, long periods of darkness, and precipitation that mostly falls as snow. 50% of the territory is bare rock and ice, or very sparse vegetation. 30% of the ecoregion has a cover of moss and lichen, and another 3% of herbaceous cover and shrubs. Some small areas on the east coast have greater plant life around hot springs, particularly marsh willowherb (Epilobium palustre)) and the northern green orchid (Platanthera hyperborea).

Studies have identified eight types of vegetation on the east coast from 72 to 79° N:

- Dwarf shrub heaths (Cassiope tetragona, Salix arctica, Vaccinium uliginosum or Betula nana,
- Grasslands (dry in summer: Arctagrostis latifolia, Carex bigelowii, sooty sedge (Carex misandra), and Eriophorum triste)
- Permanently wet fens (Carex stans, Eriophorum scheuchzeri, and Arctagrostis latifolia)
- Snowbeds (Phippsia algida, Salix herbacea, Trisetum spicatum and Erigeron humilis);
- Open, graminoid Dryas-heaths and fellfields on dry soil (Carex nardina, Carex rupestris, and Kobresia myosuroides);
- Fellfields (Calamagrostis purpurascens and Carex supina)
- Communities on wet ground that is covered by an organic crust (Koenigia islandica and Festuca hyperborea);
- Halophytic vegetation (Puccinellia phryganodes and Carex subspathacea).

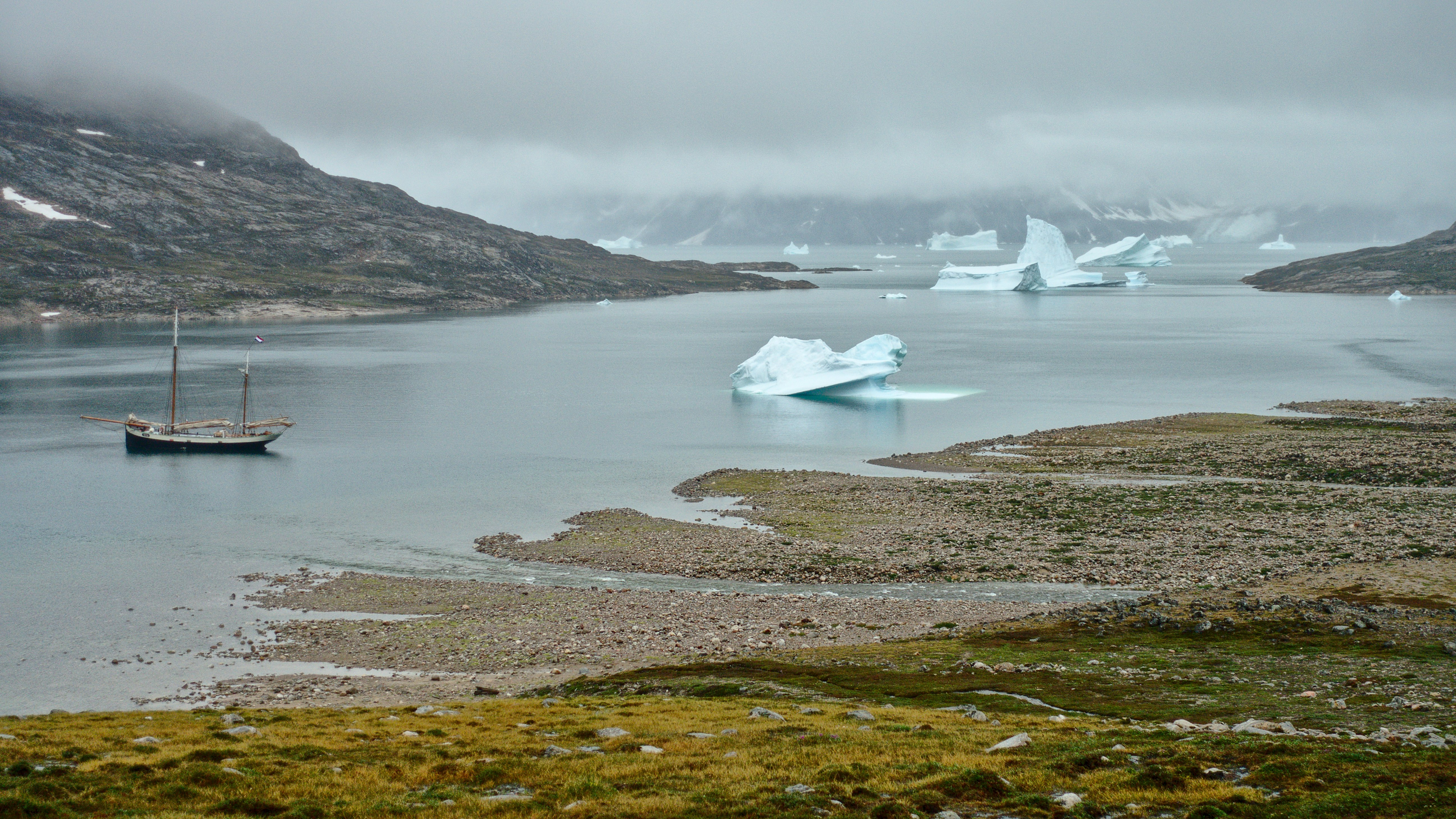
Inlet near Ittoqqortoormiit on the east coast

Nine species of terrestrial mammals occur in Greenland.

- Arctic fox (Alopex lagopus).
- Wolf (Canis lupus).
- Polar bear (Ursus maritimus). It is also classified as a marine mammal.
- Wolverine (Gulo gulo).
- Reindeer (Rangifer tarandus).
- Muskox (Ovibos moschatus). Around 40 percent of the global population of musk ox inhabits Northeast Greenland National Park.
- Ermine (Mustela erminea).
- Arctic hare (Lepus arcticus).
- Northern collared lemming (Dicrostonyx groenlandicus).

Arctic foxes, polar bears and Arctic hares are widespread in the region, while northern collared lemmings and ermines are only found from Washington Land in the northwest to Scoresby Bay in the south. Greenland wolves were formerly mostly widespread in the region, but by 2002 a stable population that recolonized northeast Greenland in 1979 disappeared. Wolverines are rare visitors from Ellesmere Island and do not permanently live in Greenland. Reindeer are found only in the northwestern part of the region in Olrik Fjord, Prudhoe Land and Inglefield Land, with the reindeer subspecies in northeast Greenland, the East Greenland caribou (Rangifer tarandus eogroenlandicus) becoming extinct around 1900. Muskox are naturally found from Nyeboe Land in the northwest to Scoresby Bay in the south, although they were reintroduced to Cape Atholl and Inglefield Land in 1986 after having disappeared from those areas in the 1860s. The Cape Atholl population was estimated at 212 in 2017 and the Inglefield Land population was estimated at 270 in 1999.

Marine mammals include the walrus (Odobenus rosmarus), bearded seal (Erignathus barbatus), harp seal (Phoca groenlandica), ringed seal (Phoca hispida), narwhal (Monodon monoceros), and beluga whale (Delphinapterus leucas).

Summer breeding birds include great northern diver (Gavia immer), barnacle goose (Branta leucopsis), pink-footed goose (Anser brachyrhynchus), common eider (Somateria mollissima), king eider (Somateria spectabilis), gyrfalcon (Falco rusticolus), snowy owl (Bubo scandiacus), sanderling (Calidris alba), red knot (Calidris canutus), rock ptarmigan (Lagopus muta), and common raven (Corvus corax).

== Protected areas ==
Over 71% of the ecoregion is officially protected. Portions of the ecoregion lie in:

- Northeast Greenland National Park. The largest national park in the world.
- Kilen Ramsar site. The northernmost Ramsar wetland in the world.
