= Brückner–Egeson–Lockyer cycle =

Climatic cycle

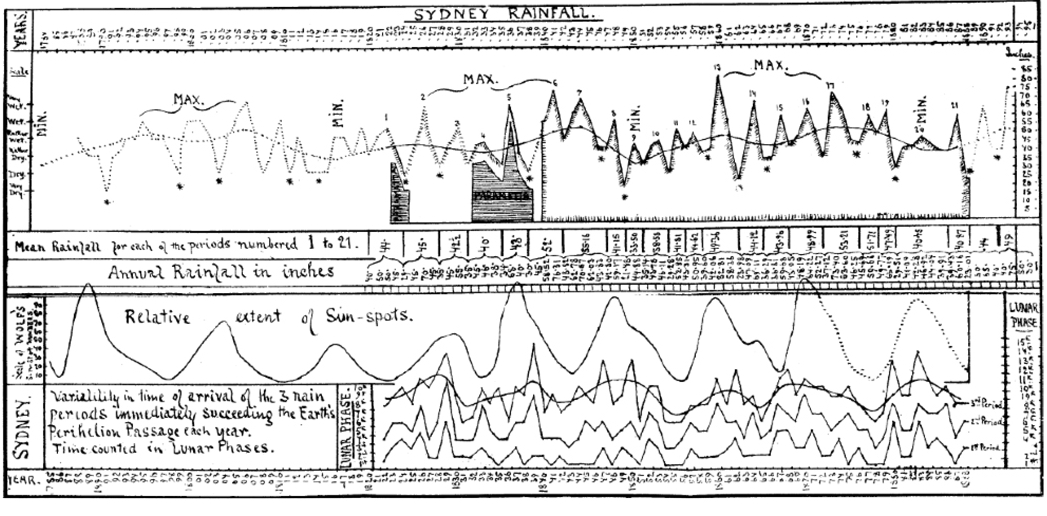
Graph of Sydney rainfall from Egeson (1889)

The Brückner–Egeson–Lockyer cycle is a climatic cycle of approximately 30-40 years. Originally described by Charles Egeson on the basis of periodic flooding events in southern Australia that correlated with sunspot activity. It was supported by William J.S. Lockyer and later by Eduard Brückner. The initials "BEL" or paratridecadal cycles have since been suggested to explain various other long-term cycles including those affecting economics, human physiology, and historical events.

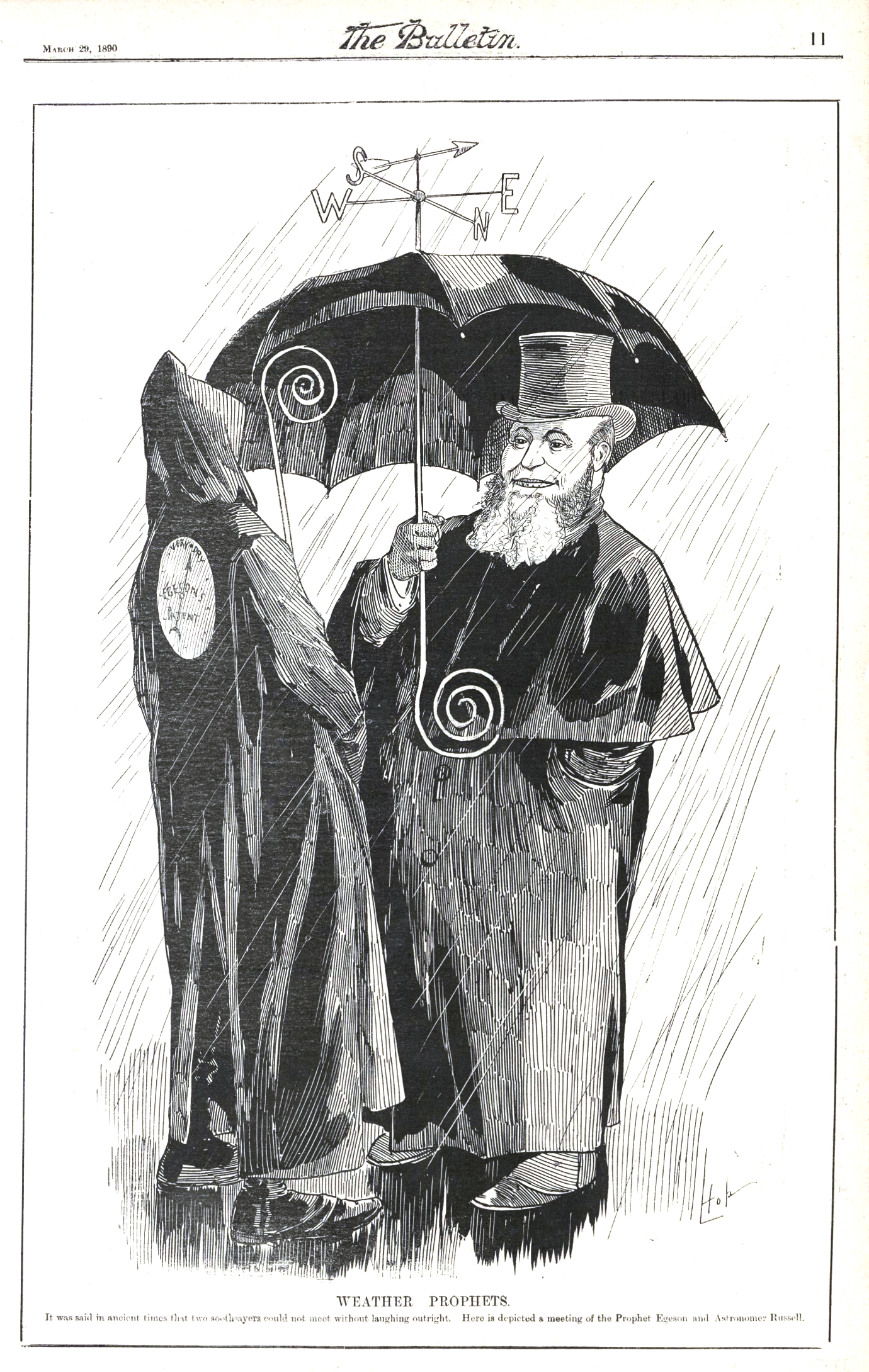
A cartoon from The Bulletin (29 March 1890) showing Charles Egeson (faceless) and Henry Chamberlain Russell with the title "Weather Prophets" and caption "It was said in ancient times that two soothsayers could not meet without laughing outright. Here is depicted a meeting of the Prophet Egeson and Astronomer Russell."

Charles Egeson (who possibly also went by the name of John Joseph George) first suggested 33 year cycles in Australian weather in 1889. Egeson was an assistant to Henry Chamberlain Russell in the Sydney Observatory. When Russell was away in Europe, he began to publish forecasts based on his cycles in the newspapers. The forecast of a drought caused considerable public alarm and led to his dismissal from the Sydney Observatory in 1890. In 1893, a warrant was issued for the arrest of Charles Egeson in a case of cheating. A news report in 1903 recorded his death in a lunatic asylum. Egeson's 1889 publication was shortly followed in 1890 by Eduard Brückner's who suggested 33 to 35 year cycles. William J. S. Lockyer, son of Sir Norman Lockyer, associated these cycles with that of sunspot activity. Similar cycles were also noted before Egeson as in the case of 35-year cycles of Perseid meteors noted by Rudolf Wolf in 1877, sunspot and weather associations by Giovanni Battista Riccioli (1651) and 30+ year cycles noted by Francis Bacon although Egeson was the first to collate numerous datasets to support the view. Egeson himself noted ancient traditional beliefs in 30 year cycles from Ceylon. Brückner described 35 year cycles of cool-damp and warm-dry weather periods, an observation that had also been made by Sir Francis Bacon.

Other datasets that have been suggested as following the BEL cycle include geomagnetism, military events, economics, and heart rates.

== See also ==
- Solar cycle
