= William James Stewart Lockyer =

English astronomer and physicist

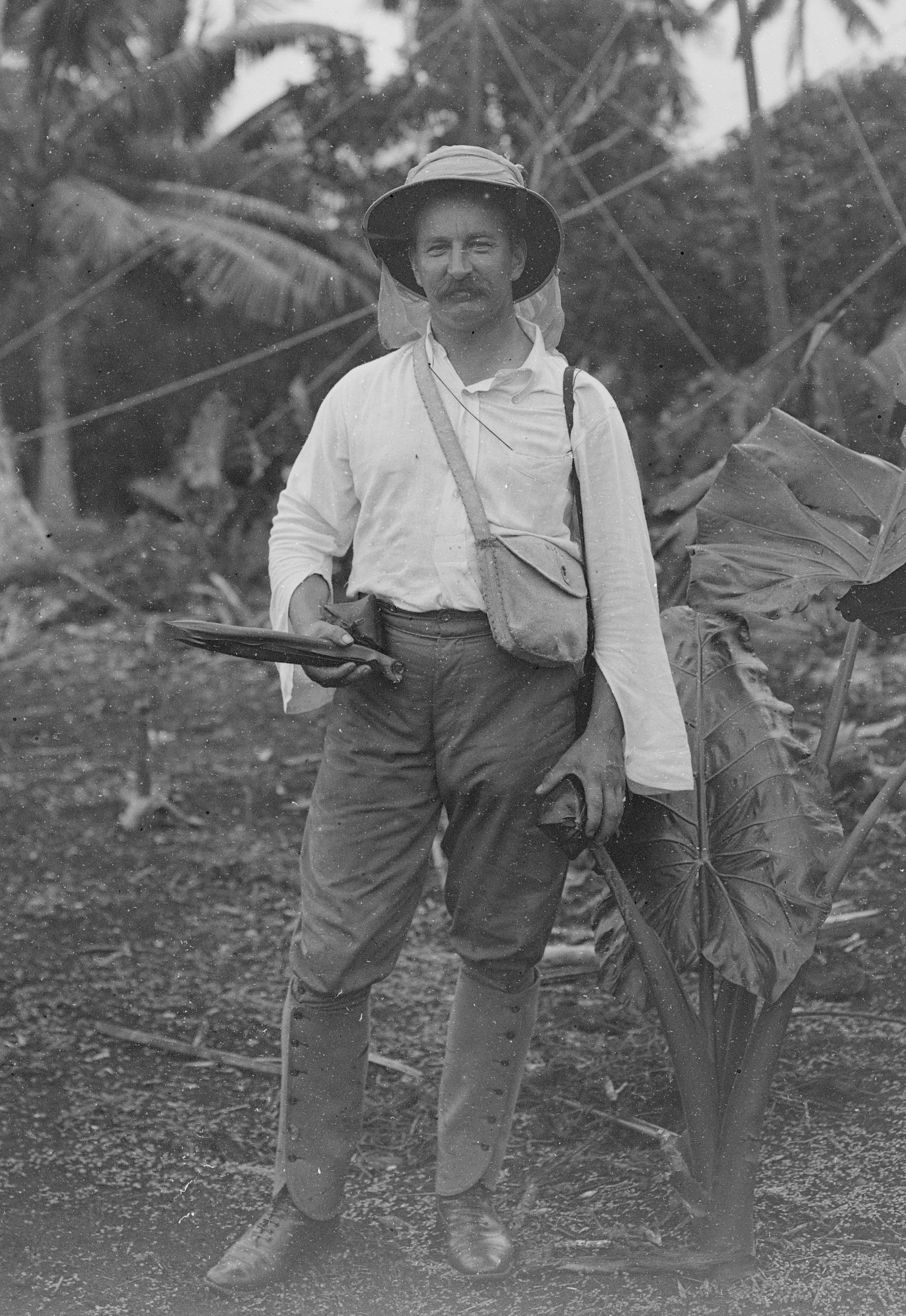
- Lockyer in Vavaʻu, Tonga, as a part of an expedition to observe the Solar eclipse of April 28, 1911
- Born: 3 January 1868
- Died: 15 July 1936 (aged 68)
- Education: Trinity College, Cambridge, Royal College of Science, University of Göttingen

William James Stewart Lockyer (3 January 1868 – 15 July 1936) was an English astronomer and physicist. His work included studies on sunspot cycles and is remembered for what is now known as the Brückner-Egeson-Lockyer cycle.

== Biography ==
William was the fifth son of Sir Norman Lockyer and his wife Winifred née James. He was educated at Cheltenham; Trinity College, Cambridge; Royal College of Science, London; and Göttingen. His doctoral work of 1896 was on the variable η Aquilae. He worked with his father initially examining sunspot periodicity and weather correlations. He then travelled around the world following eclipses from 1896 to 1932. He was involved in the establishment of the International Meteorological Committee. In 1920 he succeeded his father as director at the newly renamed Norman Lockyer Observatory in Sidmouth. Lockyer was known for his work on sunspot cycles.
In 1921 he married Kate Irene widow of Mr. William Shaw Wright and daughter of Mr. Alfred Talbot, of Southend on Sea, who survived him.
He collapsed while walking down the drive leading to the house of his step-mother, Lady Thomazine Mary Lockyer, at Salcombe Hill, Sidmouth and died suddenly on 15 July 1936.
