= Cape Prescott =

Headland in Nunavut, Canada

- Cape
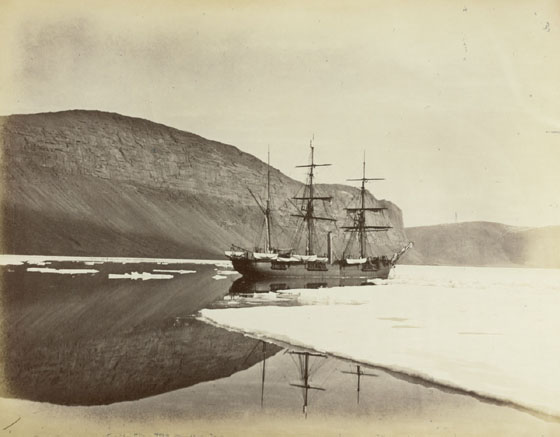
- HMS Alert off Cape Prescott in 1875

- Location in Nunavut
- Coordinates: 79°26′N 74°10′W
- Location: Ellesmere Island
- Offshore water bodies: Nares Strait

Cape Prescott is a headland in the Qikiqtaaluk Region, Nunavut, Canada.

The cape was named by the 1875–1876 British Arctic Expedition led by Captain George Nares. There is an abundance of walruses in the area.

== Geography ==
Cape Prescott is located in the eastern coast of Ellesmere Island, southwest of the Allman Bay and of the Darling Peninsula in the Nares Strait area. Cape D'Urville is located 5.5 km (3.4 mi) to the northeast, and Cape Hawks to the east northeast, on the other side of the mouth of Allman Bay. Norman Lockyer Island lies 9 km (5.6 mi) west southwest of Cape Prescott.
