= Kalaallit Nunaat Arctic Steppe =

Ecoregion in Greenland

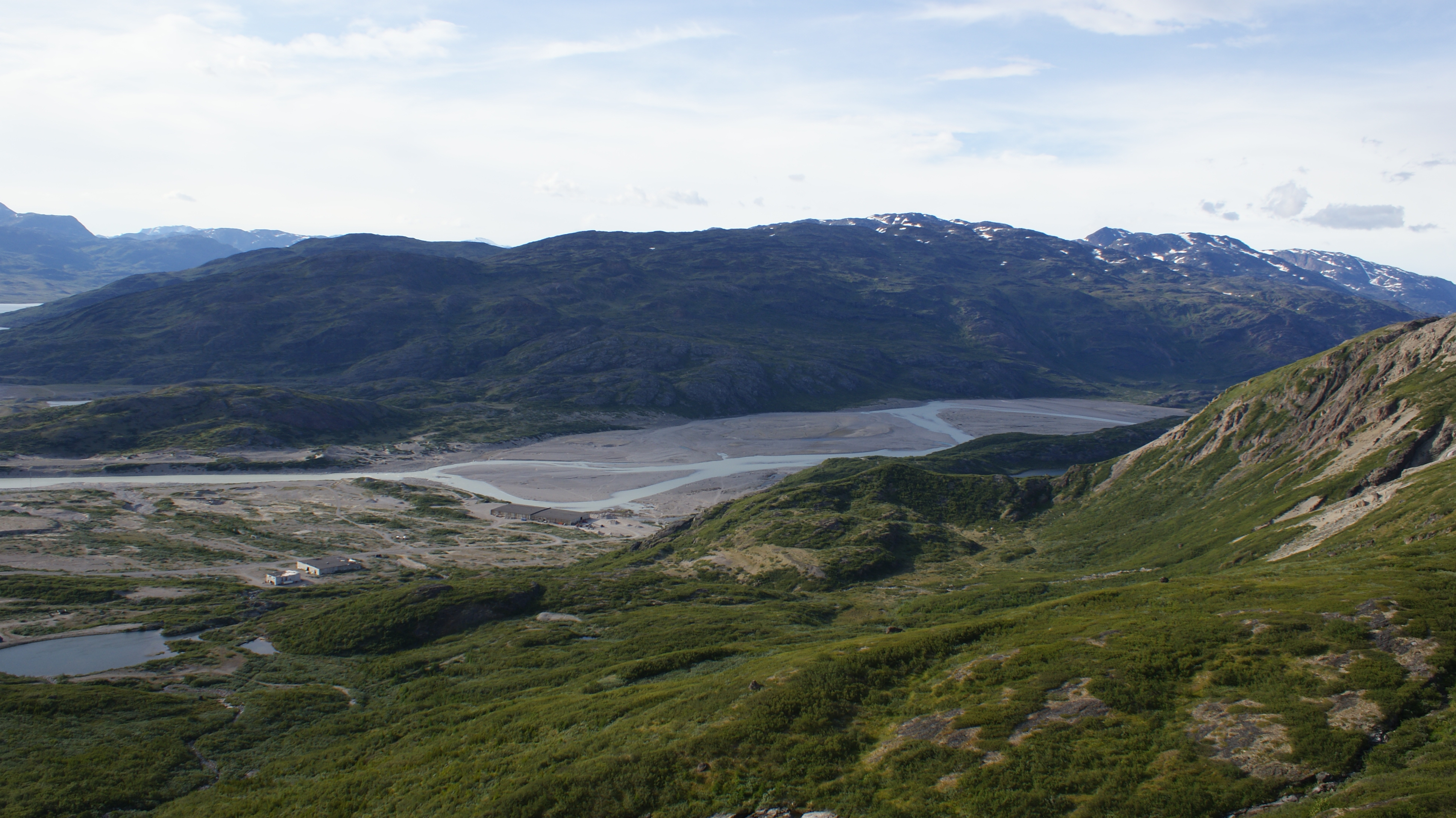
- Narsarsuaq, Greenland on the southwest coast

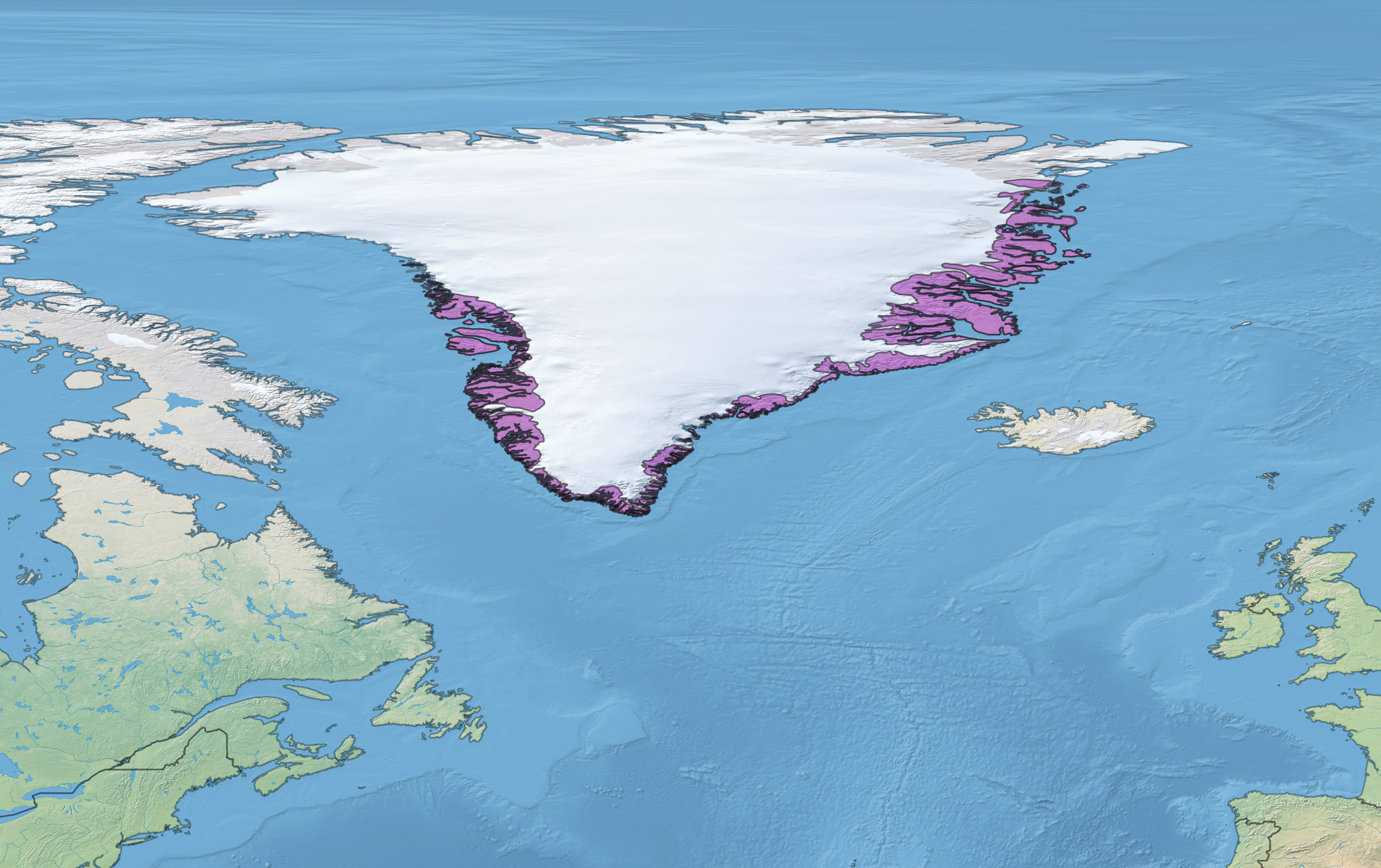
- Map of the Kalaallit Nunaat Arctic Steppe (purple)

Ecology
- Realm: Nearctic
- Biome: Tundra
- Borders: Kalaallit Nunaat high arctic tundra

Geography
- Area: 171,411 km^{2} (66,182 mi^{2})
- Country: Denmark
- State: Greenland

The Kalaallit Nunaat Arctic Steppe (Kalaallit Nunaat low arctic tundra) ecoregion covers the low coastal areas of western and southern Greenland, reaching in up to 100 km before bare rock and ice become dominant. While much of the ecoregion is bare rock or ice, about 50% of the ground is covered in moss and lichen, and another 10% in herbaceous cover, shrubs, and even small stands of trees.

== Location and description ==
The ecoregion covers the southern coastal fringe of Greenland, from a high of 75° N latitude at Melville Bay, around the southern coast to 70° N at Scoresby Bay on the east coast. The coastal bands north of this are in the Kalaallit Nunaat high arctic tundra ecoregion. The coast is rugged, with a mean elevation of 561 metres (1,841 ft), with deep inlets from the sea.

== Climate ==
The climate of the ecoregion is Tundra climate (Köppen climate classification ET), a local climate in which at least one month has an average temperature high enough to melt snow (0 °C (32 °F)), but no month with an average temperature in excess of 10 °C (50 °F). Due to the East Greenland Current, the east coast is colder than the west coast.

== Flora and fauna ==
On the west coast, the relatively warmer climate supports a dwarf-scrub heath and steppe-like vegetation. The warmest and driest areas, at the head of fjords, there are sheltered areas that support scrub and low forests of green alder (Alnus alnobetula), white birch (Betula pubescens), and Greenland mountain ash (Sorbus groenlandica). The birches are typically under 2 meters tall, though some can grow to 10 meters.

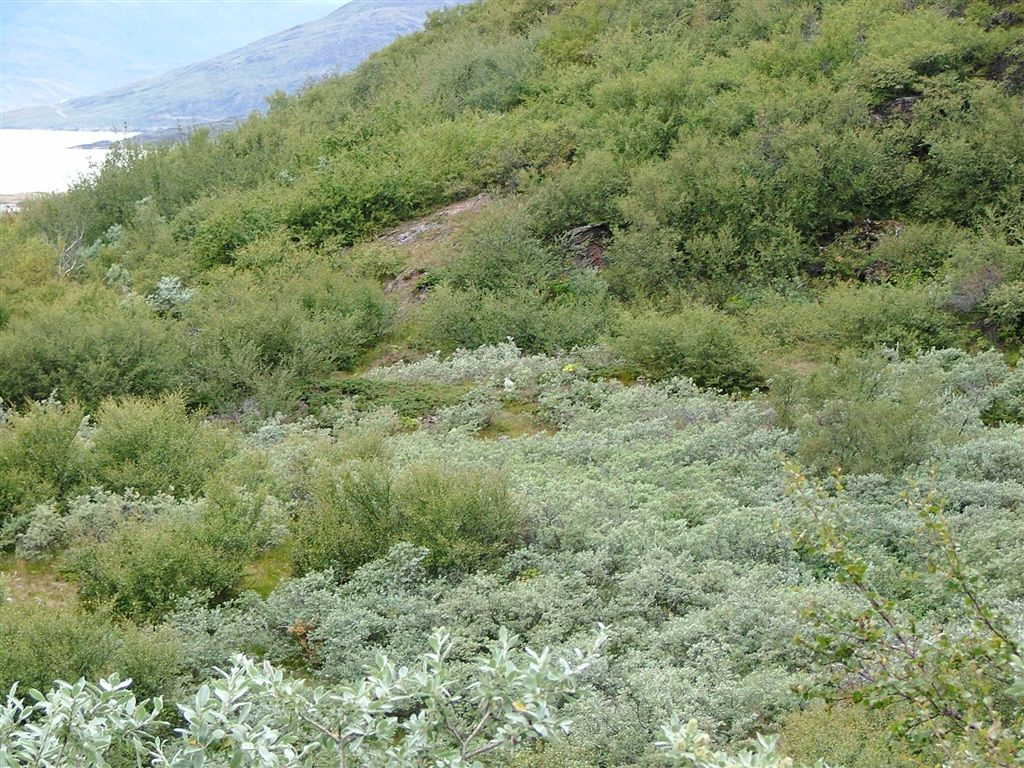
Arctic hare, Salix trees and bushes in Narsarsuaq, South Greenland

== Protected areas ==
About 5% of the ecoregion is officially protected. These protected areas include Ilulissat Icefjord.
