= Norman Lockyer Island =

Island in Nunavut, Canada

- Location within Nunavut Location within Canada

Geography
- Location: Northern Canada
- Coordinates: 79°24′N 074°39′W
- Archipelago: Queen Elizabeth Islands; Arctic Archipelago

Administration
- Canada
- Territory: Nunavut
- Region: Qikiqtaaluk Region

Demographics
- Population: Uninhabited

Norman Lockyer Island is located off the eastern coast of Ellesmere Island, and a part of the Qikiqtaaluk Region of the Canadian territory of Nunavut. Situated in Princess Marie Bay just in front of Franklin Pierce Bay, 9 km (5.6 mi) WSW of Cape Prescott, north of Bache Peninsula, Norman Lockyer Island is within the Arctic Archipelago, a member of the Queen Elizabeth Islands.

== History ==
It is named in honor of the English scientist and astronomer Joseph Norman Lockyer.

In 1882, Norman Lockyer Island was the most northerly point reached by the relief vessel, the Neptune, trying to reach Adolphus Greely's Lady Franklin Expedition.
