= Locker (disambiguation) =

A locker is a small storage compartment.

Locker may also refer to:

- Locker (software)
- Locker (surname), various people
- The Lockers, a dance group
- Lockers Bay, a bay of the island of Newfoundland, Canada
- Locking carabiner, a type of carabiner which locks
- Locking differential, a variation on the standard automotive differential; also known as a locker
- Locker, performer of a dance known as locking

== See also ==
- Lock (disambiguation)
