= Bohun =

Bohun can refer to:

- Bohun (surname)
- Bohun, Iran, a village in Isfahan Province, Iran
- Bohun, a novel by Jacek Komuda
- Snowswampmobile Bohun, Ukrainian off-road rescue vehicle
