= Jacob Makohin =

Ukrainian nobleman; US Marine Corps officer (1880–1956)

- Яків Макогін
- Born: Yakiv Makohin; September 27, 1880; Viazova, Austria-Hungary (now Ukraine)
- Died: January 13, 1956 (aged 75); Newton, Massachusetts, United States
- Resting place: Arlington National Cemetery
- Occupation(s): Military and public figure, philanthropist, pretender nobleman
- Spouse: Susan F. Fallon

Jacob Makohin (Note: Ukrainian: Яків Макогін, romanized: Yakiv Makohin) (born September 27, 1880), who also styled himself as Prince Leon Bogun Mazeppa von Razumovsky, (Note: Ukrainian: князь Леон Богун Мазепа Розумовський, romanized: kniaz Leon Bohun Mazepa Rozumovskyi) was a Ukrainian American military and public figure, philanthropist, pretender nobleman and a pretender to the Hetmanship of Ukraine. He claimed to be the sole surviving descendant of Count Kirill Grigorievich Razumovsky, who was the last hetman of Zaporozhian Host, although there is no evidence for this.

Makohin was born in Viazova, Austria-Hungary (now Ukraine). When he was 27 years old, he escaped to the United States via Canada. Under the name Makohin he enlisted in the United States Marine Corps and served during World War I as a pilot. He was promoted to Second Lieutenant June 1, 1919, and retired after being injured.

At Arlington National Cemetery

He married Susan F. Fallon (1891–1976) of Massachusetts. Together, they lived in Austria and then Alassio, Italy during the 1930s and early 40s. During World War II that they were forced to flee back to the United States where they settled in Newton, Massachusetts. They had no children.

Jacob Makohin died on January 13, 1956, and was buried in Arlington National Cemetery. His wife Susan was buried with him after her death in 1976.
