= Damien De Bohun =

Damien De Bohun is the former Head of the A-League. He was previously in charge of game and market development for Cricket Australia. He was announced as the new head of the A-League on 6 July 2012, and resigned in March 2016.
