= Bogunović =

Bogunović (Serbian Cyrillic: Богуновић) is a Serbian surname, a patronymic derived from Bogun Nemanjić, Bogun, Bogunović are the only known family that "the male line" leads directly descended from noble family Nemanjić. It may refer to:

- Miloš Bogunović, Serbian footballer
- Milan Bogunović, Serbian footballer
- Saša Bogunović, Serbian footballer
- Miloš S. Bogunović, Chetnik commander
- Branko Bogunović, Chetnik commander.
- Nikanor Bogunović (fl. 1778–83), Serbian Orthodox bishop in Dalmatia.
- Vladimir Bogunović, Serbian academic.
- Goran Bogunović, Croatian handballer

== Anthropology ==
The patronymic de Bogun is mentioned in the Republic of Ragusa in the period of 1383–1403; a family of Cattaro (Kotor) is mentioned (Andruschus Lauriçe de Bogun dictus Nemagna). There was an old Orthodox family of Bogunović in Šibenik, Croatia (1898). There is a large Serb brotherhood called Bogunović with 396 houses and 22 surnames, with the slava of St. John (1925). In Lika, Croatia, there were 79 houses of Bogunović in 8 settlements (1925). There were Bogunović families in the city of Drvar, and villages of Bastasi and Šipovljani, in western Bosnia and Herzegovina (BiH), recorded in 1948. A Bogunović family in Vogošća, BiH, hailed from Bosanska Dubica, BiH (1967). A Bogunović family lived in Banatsko Karađorđevo, Serbia (1968). People with the surname live in Belgrade.

== See also ==
- Bogutović, surname
