= Norman Lockyer Observatory =

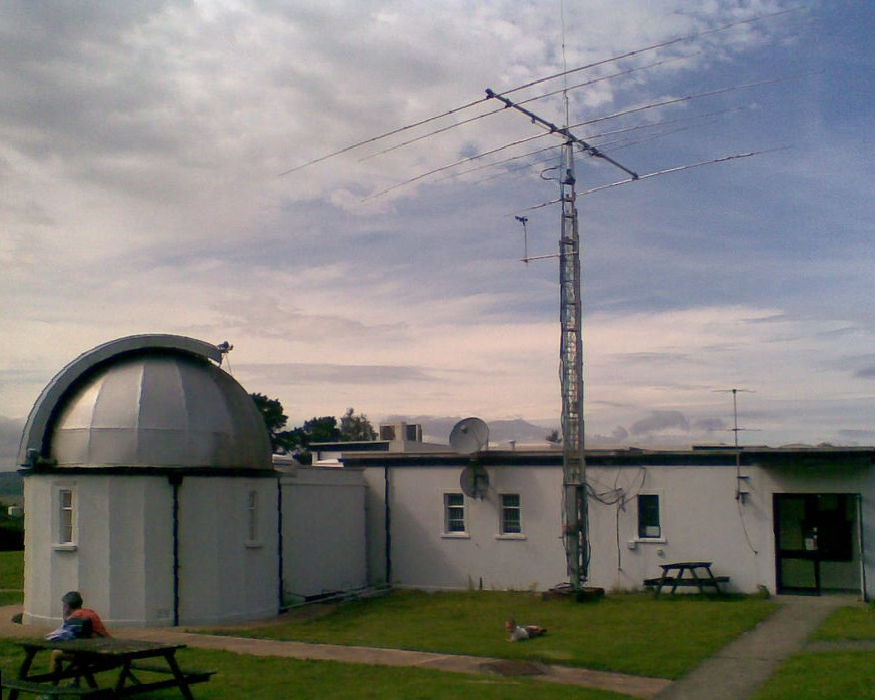
- The Norman Lockyer Observatory in 2010, showing the Mond Dome
- Alternative names: NLO
- Named after: Norman Lockyer
- Location: Sidmouth, East Devon, Devon, South West England, England
- Coordinates: 50°41′17″N 3°13′11″W
- Website: www.normanlockyer.com
- Telescopes: Kensington Telescope; Lockyer Telescope; McClean Telescope
- Location of Norman Lockyer Observatory
- Related media on Commons

The Norman Lockyer Observatory, the Lockyer Technology Centre, and the Planetarium (jointly NLO), is a public access optical observatory 1 mile (1.6 km) east of Sidmouth, East Devon in South West England. It houses a number of historical optical telescopes, including the Lockyer Telescope, and is operated by Norman Lockyer Observatory Society (NLOS).

== History ==
The observatory was founded by Joseph Norman Lockyer in 1912 when he retired to Sidmouth following the closure of the South Kensington Observatory, of which Lockyer was Director. Originally known as Hill Observatory, the observatory was renamed Norman Lockyer Observatory after his death in 1920. Thomazine Mary Lockyer a.k.a. "Lady Lockyer", took a strong interest in the observatory and made gifts to it. She was elected to the Royal Astronomical Society in 1923.

The Observatory's historic instruments are associated with Lockyer's pioneering work on star temperature which led to theories of stellar evolution and the foundation of astrophysics.

The facility was operated by the University of Exeter between 1948 and 1984. In 1984 East Devon District Council became the owner/trustee of the observatory and after a period of renovation leased it to Norman Lockyer Observatory Society (NLOS) in 1995. An exhibition area and 60-seat planetarium was added in 1996 and a 100-seat convention center for lectures and academic conferences added in 2005. The Connaught Dome, which incorporates 'Lockyer Technology Centre' (the observatory's radio astronomy facility), was opened in 2012.

The observatory is staffed by volunteers, and regularly open to the public on published afternoons and evenings.

== Instruments ==
The observatory provides modern telescopes with computer enhanced imaging, maintains some of the nation's most historic astronomical instruments and enjoys a relatively dark night sky with a southerly aspect across the sea. There are five domes:

- 'Mond', housing the 6¼-inch Lockyer Telescope. Built in 1871, this optical refractor telescope is on a German equatorial mount. Norman Lockyer used the objective lens from this telescope to discover helium in 1868 (before the lens was used in the telescope).
- 'Kensington', housing the Kensington Telescope. Built in 1881 for the Solar Physics Observatory, London, this dual refractor telescope has a 10" tube for observation and 9" tube with attached prism and plate glass camera for spectroscopy.
- 'McClean', housing the McClean Telescope, donated to the observatory by Francis McClean in 1912. Built in 1897 by the Grubb Telescope Company, it is a dual refractor consisting of a 12" tube and attachment for a plate glass camera, and a 10" tube for observing. Associated with this telescope is the Cooke Siderostat which projects the Sun's optical spectrum and Fraunhofer absorption lines within the Dome annex.
- 'Connaught', housing a 20" reflector and the observatory's radio astronomy facility (Lockyer Technology Centre).
- 'Victoria', housing a 12" reflector.

The observatory is particularly well situated for spectral analysis in astronomy, which requires a clear sky over the whole optical spectrum, as it enjoys a relatively "clean" sky to the east and south across the sea. The atmosphere is usually free of air pollution and light pollution and, as the sea has a uniform temperature, the air is also free of rising currents which can distort optical images.

The observatory is active in both optical and radio astronomy and has an astro imaging group, a technology group, a meteorology and weather satellite facility and a science history group. The observatory's radio call sign is 'GB2NLO' for special events at the observatory.

It cooperates with undergraduate courses of the University of Exeter, the University of Plymouth and the Open Universities, and is available for scientific and educational development projects. The observatory is home to the annual South West Astronomy Fair on the second Saturday in August. The observatory celebrated its centenary in 2012, with commemorative events throughout the year, as well as the openings of the Connaught Dome (20" reflector) and Lockyer Technology Centre by Brian May.

The observatory holds a library, including glass spectral plates. An archive of Lockyer's papers is held at the University of Exeter.

== Society ==
The observatory is home to the astronomical society "Norman Lockyer Observatory Society (NLOS)", founded in 1995. It is a registered charity with the principal activities of promoting the public understanding of science, technology and astronomy and supporting science education in schools and universities. The facility is financed solely by its membership, private donations and income derived from Public Open Days. No funding is received from national or local government agencies nor does it receive ongoing grants from any organisation.

== See also ==
- Armagh Observatory and Planetarium
- Astronomy Centre
- Greenwich Royal Observatory
- Jodrell Bank Observatory
- Mills Observatory, Balgay, Dundee
- Observatory Science Centre, Herstmonceux, East Sussex.
- Royal Observatory, Edinburgh
