= Lawrence Bohun =

Physician General of Virginia colony

Doctor Lawrence Bohun Physician General of Virginia
- Born: Between 1575 and 1585; Kingdom of England
- Died: March, 1620/21 (O.S./N.S.); Near Guadeloupe, West Indies
- Cause of death: Spanish raiders
- Other names: Bohunne, Linis Boone,
- Education: University of Leyden
- Occupation: Physician
- Spouse: Alice Barnes

Lawrence Bohun (born between 1575 and 1585, d. 1621) was an English physician and member of the Virginia Governor's Council. His surname is occasionally spelled "Bohune" or "Boone" and he is known for experimenting with some of Virginia's indigenous plants and minerals. He is sometimes credited with being the first experimental scientist in Jamestown and one of its first physicians.

Not much is known about Bohun's early life, but it is estimated that he was born in England between 1575 and 1585 and that he received his education at the University of Leyden in the Netherlands. Bohun had a reputation for being an excellent physician and was hired to perform as the personal physician for Thomas West, 3rd Baron De La Warr, who was the first governor of Virginia appointed by the Virginia Company of London. He arrived in Virginia on 10 June 1610, which enabled him to help with colonists that had survived the Starving Time of that prior winter. While living in Virginia, Bohun experimented with sassafras and rhubarb as medicines. Bohun also worked on brewing wine.

When De La Warr left Virginia the following year in order to recuperate from a bout of scurvy, Bohun accompanied him on the trip. They eventually ended in England, where Bohun practiced medicine and married Alice Barnes. During this time Bohun was active with the Virginia Company, as he was listed as a sharecropper in their third charter and was approved for two grants for Virginia land. Bohun was interested in seeing if silkworms could be cultivated in Virginia, which was evidently unsuccessful as records from the Virginia Company stated that he had a project (presumably the silkworms) that "promised much benefitt but in the end came to nothinge."

Bohun was appointed the Physician General of the Virginia colony in 1620 and was also appointed to the Governor's Council, but he would never make it to Virginia to carry out his responsibilities. He departed England on the Margaret and John with Captain Anthony Chester in December, 1620. While stopping at Guadeloupe for water and supplies, the ship was attacked by Spanish warships and Bohun received a mortal wound. His final words to Captain Chester were "Fight it out, brave man, the cause is good, and Lord receive my soul."
