= Bobbi Lockyer =

Aboriginal Australian artist

- Born: Port Hedland, Western Australia
- Occupation: Artist
- Website: bobbilockyer.com

Bobbi Lockyer is an Aboriginal Australian artist, whose work has been showcased around the world. She was the 2025 official First Nations Artist of the Australian Open tennis series.

== Early life and education ==
Bobbi Lockyer was born and raised in Port Hedland, which is situated in the remote Pilbara region of Western Australia. She is of Nyulnyul of Ngarluma, Kariyarra, and Yawuru descent. She has said that her family was very creative; her mother and grandmother were "always creating".

She was interested in art and painting from a very young age. As a young school student, a teacher advised Lockyer to "get her head out of the clouds" about her passion and childhood dream of becoming a painter or artist.

== Art practice and career ==
Lockyer's art is influenced by flora and fauna, including gum leaves and wattle or acacia flowers and leaves, and the pink hues of desert landscapes, as well as landscapes from the region she lives, in remote Western Australia.

Her work titled Bobbi Lockyer home collection was for sale in Woolworths, Big W, and other stores in 2024.

Her art was displayed at a photo festival in western France, where 11 of her artworks, featuring children, landscapes, and Indigenous Australian faces, were shown in 2024.

Lockyer was the 2025 official artist of the Australian Open tennis series. Her art was featured on the Margaret Court Arena during the 2025 Australian Open.

== Recognition and awards ==
Lockyer's artwork has been showcased in Vogue magazine, on Paris and New York runways, as well as at Sydney Fashion Week in 2022. As of 2021 she was an official creator for Nikon.

Lockyer's awards and career highlights include the following:

- 2021: NAIDOC Artist of the Year
- 2023: Artwork chosen as NAIDOC Week poster
- 2025: Australian Open First Nations Artist

== Personal life ==
Lockyer uses her art to raise awareness and understanding of issues such as domestic violence, racism, and birth trauma. She has used inspiration from being bullied at high school to influence her art and draw strength, finding healing from the creative process in painting and art.

She has four sons and was living in Port Hedland in 2025.
