= Bohuňov (Svitavy District) =

- Municipality
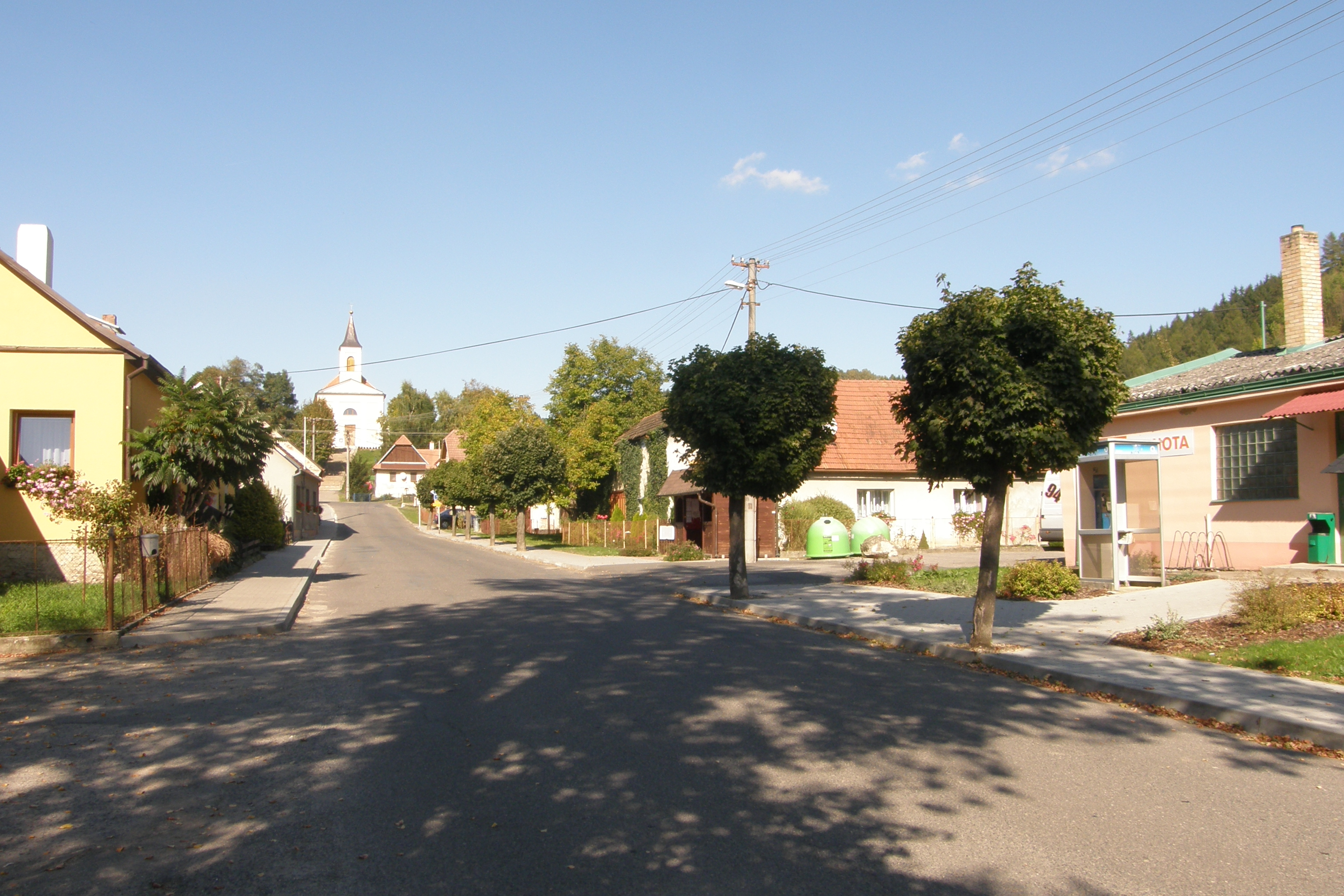
- View towards the Church of Saint Giles

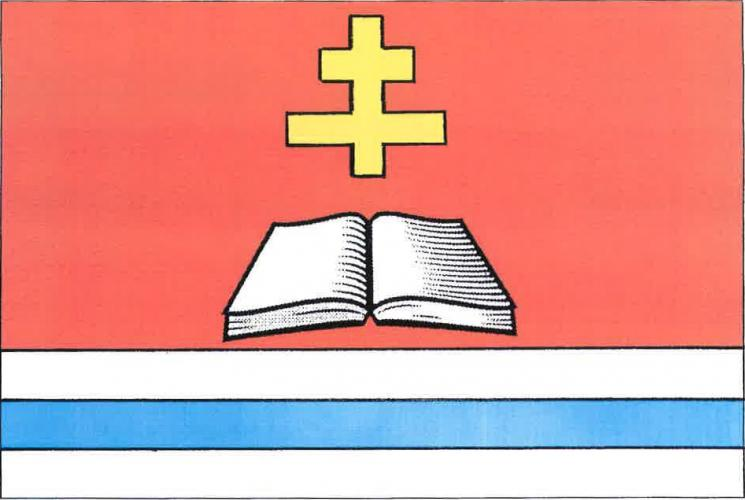
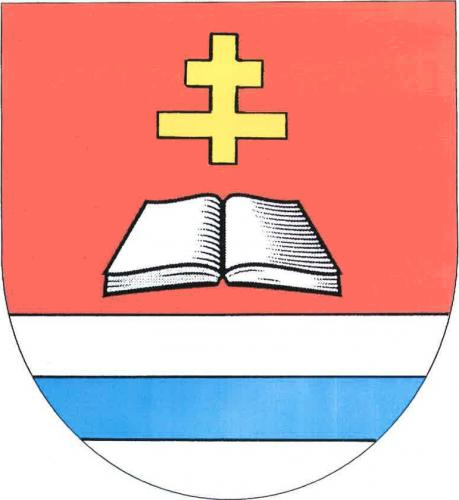
- Flag Coat of arms

- Location in the Czech Republic
- Coordinates: 49°35′57″N 16°27′50″E
- Country: Czech Republic
- Region: Pardubice
- District: Svitavy
- First mentioned: 1382

Area
  - Total: 2.90 km^{2} (1.12 sq mi)
- Elevation: 398 m (1,306 ft)

Population (2026-01-01)
  - Total: 124
  - Density: 42.8/km^{2} (111/sq mi)
- Time zone: UTC+1 (CET)
  - Summer (DST): UTC+2 (CEST)
- Postal code: 569 04
- Website: www.obecbohunov.cz

Bohuňov is a municipality and village in Svitavy District in the Pardubice Region of the Czech Republic. It has about 100 inhabitants.

Bohuňov lies approximately 18 kilometres (11 mi) south of Svitavy, 70 km (43 mi) south-east of Pardubice, and 157 km (98 mi) east of Prague.

== Demographics ==
Historical population
Year	Pop.	±%
1869	375	—
1880	343	−8.5%
1890	345	+0.6%
1900	368	+6.7%
1910	422	+14.7%
1921	370	−12.3%
1930	392	+5.9%
1950	305	−22.2%
1961	317	+3.9%
1970	287	−9.5%
1980	255	−11.1%
1991	204	−20.0%
2001	181	−11.3%
2011	161	−11.0%
2021	133	−17.4%
Source: Censuses
