= Bohuňov (Žďár nad Sázavou District) =

- Municipality
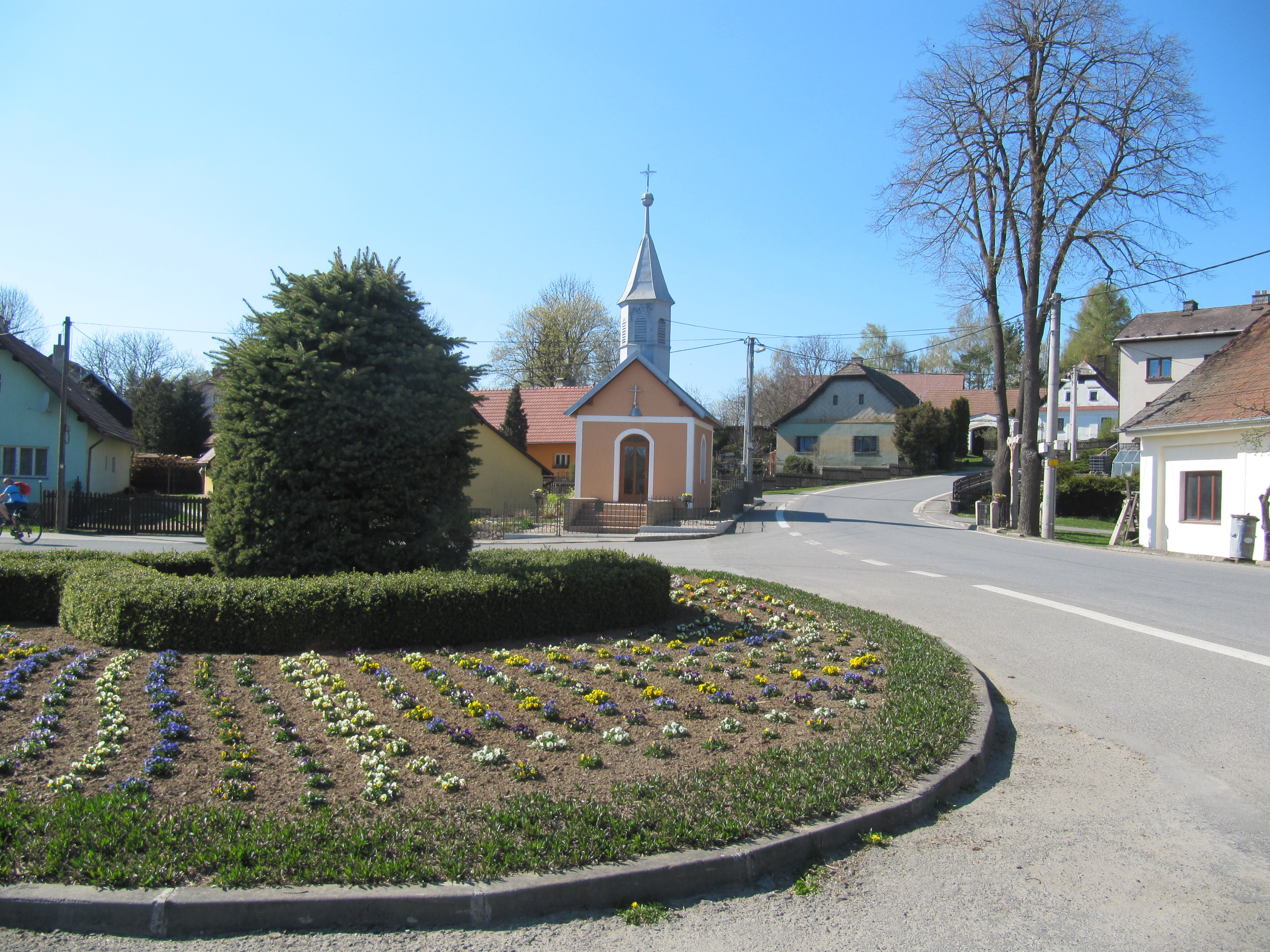
- Centre of Bohuňov with the Chapel of Saints Cyril and Methodius

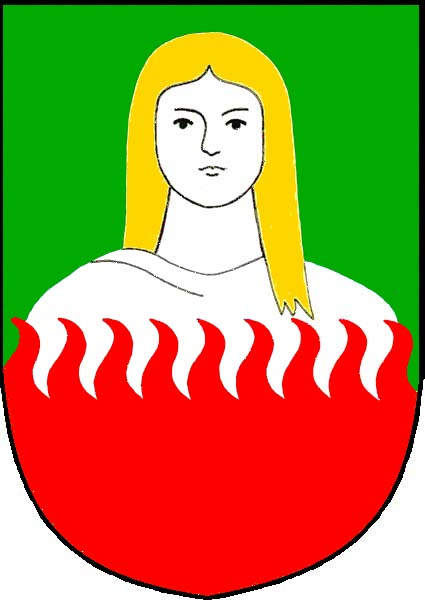
- Flag Coat of arms

- Location in the Czech Republic
- Coordinates: 49°33′38″N 16°12′9″E
- Country: Czech Republic
- Region: Vysočina
- District: Žďár nad Sázavou
- First mentioned: 1384

Area
  - Total: 4.44 km^{2} (1.71 sq mi)
- Elevation: 624 m (2,047 ft)

Population (2026-01-01)
  - Total: 286
  - Density: 64.4/km^{2} (167/sq mi)
- Time zone: UTC+1 (CET)
  - Summer (DST): UTC+2 (CEST)
- Postal code: 593 01
- Website: www.bohunov.cz

Bohuňov is a municipality and village in Žďár nad Sázavou District in the Vysočina Region of the Czech Republic. It has about 300 inhabitants.

Bohuňov lies approximately 19 kilometres (12 mi) east of Žďár nad Sázavou, 48 km (30 mi) east of Jihlava, and 141 km (88 mi) south-east of Prague.

== Administrative division ==
Bohuňov consists of two municipal parts (in brackets population according to the 2021 census):

- Bohuňov (211)
- Janovičky (43)

== Demographics ==
Historical population
Year	Pop.	±%
1869	397	—
1880	414	+4.3%
1890	391	−5.6%
1900	356	−9.0%
1910	314	−11.8%
1921	324	+3.2%
1930	288	−11.1%
1950	240	−16.7%
1961	238	−0.8%
1970	222	−6.7%
1980	230	+3.6%
1991	245	+6.5%
2001	245	+0.0%
2011	245	+0.0%
2021	254	+3.7%
Source: Censuses
