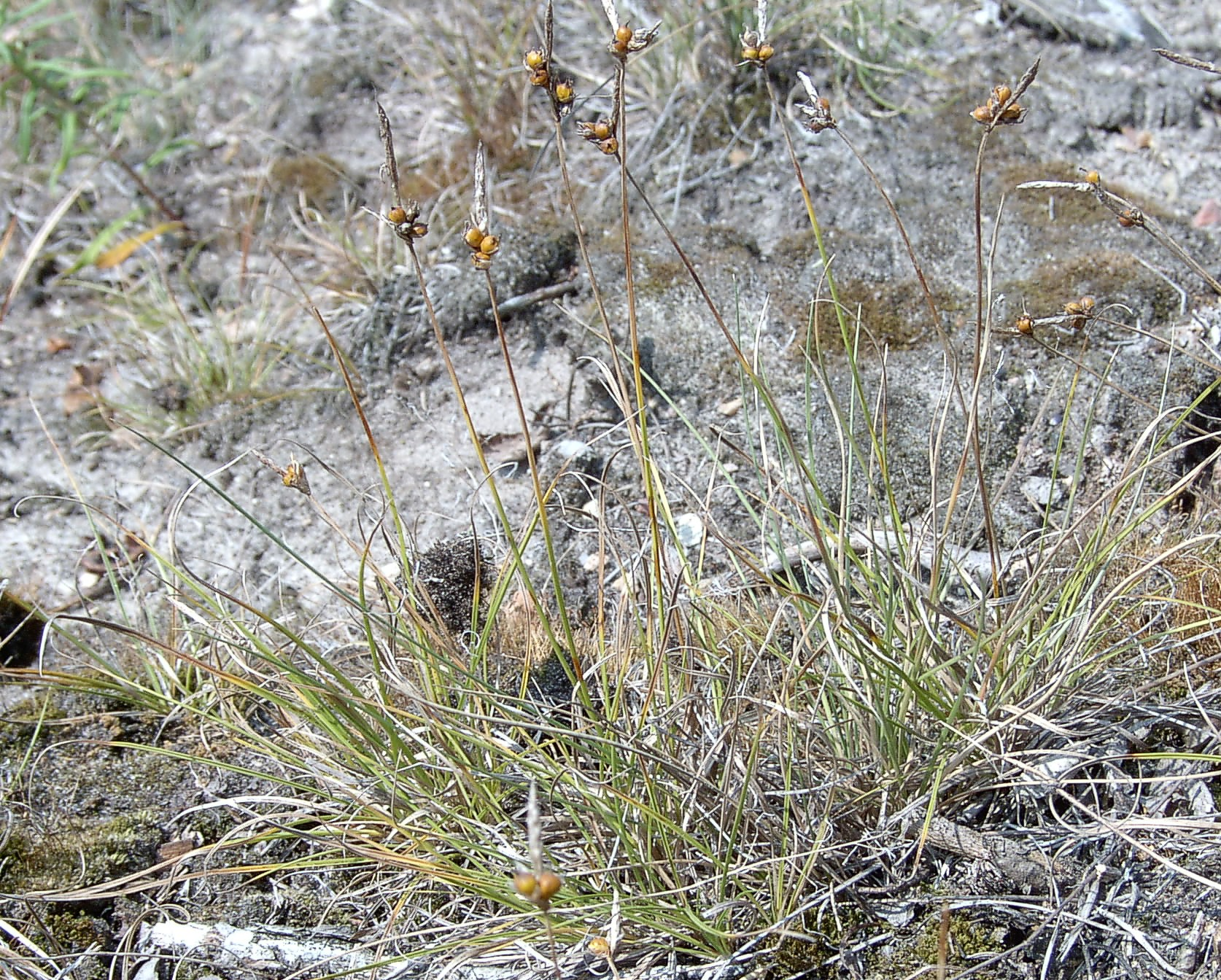
- Habit

Scientific classification
- Kingdom: Plantae
- Clade: Tracheophytes
- Clade: Angiosperms
- Clade: Monocots
- Clade: Commelinids
- Order: Poales
- Family: Cyperaceae
- Genus: Carex
- Species: C. supina

Binomial name
- Carex supina Willd. ex Wahlenb.

Synonyms
- Edritria supina (Willd. ex Wahlenb.) Raf.

= Carex supina =

Species of grass-like plant

Carex supina, called the weak arctic sedge, is a species of flowering plant in the genus Carex, native to Alaska, western and central Canada, Minnesota, Greenland, central and eastern Europe, the Caucasus region, Central Asia, Siberia, the Himalaya, the Amur region, Manchuria, and Korea. It is often found in association with Festuca altaica and Poa glauca.

== Subtaxa ==
The following varieties are currently accepted:

- Carex supina var. spaniocarpa (Steud.) B.Boivin
- Carex supina var. supina
