= Margaret de Bohun =

Margaret de Bohun may refer to:

- Margaret of Hereford (1122/1123–1197), English noblewoman, eldest daughter of Miles de Gloucester, 1st Earl of Hereford, wife of Humphrey II de Bohun
- Margaret de Bohun, Countess of Devon (1311–1391), English noblewoman, granddaughter of King Edward I and Eleanor of Castile, wife of Hugh Courtenay, 10th Earl of Devon
