= Lockers Bay =

Natural bay in Newfoundland and Labrador, Canada

Coordinates: 48.899°N 53.948°W

Lockers Bay is a natural bay off the island of Newfoundland in the province of Newfoundland and Labrador, Canada.
