= Dobbin Bay =

Bay in Nunavut, Canada

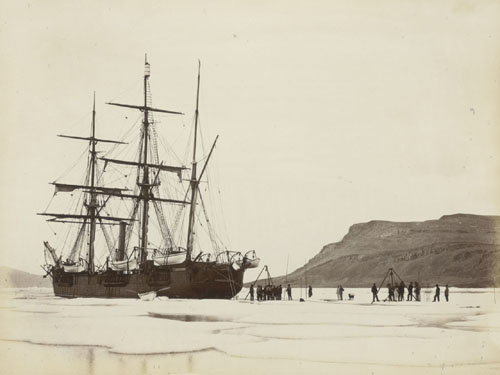
- HMS Alert in Dobbin Bay, 1875

- Location within Nunavut
- Location: Kane Basin, Nares Strait
- Coordinates: 79°45′N 73°45′W
- Ocean/sea sources: Arctic Ocean
- Basin countries: Canada
- Settlements: Uninhabited

Dobbin Bay is an Arctic waterway in the Qikiqtaaluk Region, Nunavut, Canada. It is located in the Kane Basin, Nares Strait by eastern Ellesmere Island, south of the Darling Peninsula.

== Exploration ==
During the British Arctic Expedition of 1875 under George Nares, ancient cairns were found on Washington Irving Island (79°34′N 73°00′W), located in the mouth of the bay.

The area was also explored by Adolphus Greely during his Lady Franklin Bay Expedition of 1881–1884.
