= Thomazine Mary Lockyer =

British astronomer and suffragist

Thomazine Mary Browne Lady Lockyer
- Born: 1 July 1852; Bridgwater, Somerset
- Died: 9 September 1943 (aged 91); Sidmouth, Devon
- Education: Queen's College, London, University College, London
- Occupations: Astronomer, suffragist
- Organization(s): Royal Astronomical Society, National Union of Women's Suffrage Societies
- Spouse(s): Bernhard E. Brodhurst (married 1885–1900); Norman Lockyer (married 1903–1920)

Thomazine Mary Lockyer (née Browne; 1 July 1852 – 9 September 1943) was a British astronomer, suffragist, and Unitarian. She was elected a member of the Royal Astronomical Society in 1923.

== Life ==
Thomazine Mary Browne was born in Bridgwater, Somerset in 1852, the daughter of Thomazine Leigh (née Carslake) and Samuel Woolcott Browne. Both parents were active in social reform, with mother founding the Leigh Browne Trust to promote scientific research without animal experimentation. She studied natural philosophy and astronomy at Queens College, London, as well as undertaking courses in physics and applied mathematics at University College, London.

Thomazine and her sister Annie Leigh Browne worked to improve housing conditions in London, including at Toynbee Hall. In 1882, she and Annie were among the founders of College Hall, London, alongside others including Henry Morley and Anna Swanwick.

Thomazine married Bernhard E. Brodhurst, F.R.C.S., a surgeon 31 years her senior, in 1885. He died in 1900.

On 23 May 1903, Thomazine married astronomer and scientist Norman Lockyer, sixteen years older than she was. The pair knew each other from before her first marriage, when she had visited the Solar Physics Observatory in South Kensington established by Lockyer. The couple moved to Sidmouth, Devon, to where Lockyer moved his observatory. Thomazine always took a close interest in the observatory, which she gifted to the nation in 1914.

A lifelong suffragist, Thomazine was treasurer of the Women’s Local Government Society. When the National Union of Women's Suffrage Societies (NUWSS) formed a branch in Sidmouth in 1909, she became secretary, holding the post until 1918. Known particularly for her outreach work, Thomazine proposed a resolution that led to the branch's support for the creation of an Infants’ Welfare Club in Sidmouth. In 1916, Thomazine she became honorary treasurer of the Sidmouth Maternity & Infant Welfare Centre. Though she resigned as NUWSS branch secretary in 1918, she was subsequently elected President, overseeing the branch's transition into the Sidmouth Citizens’ Association.

Norman Lockyer died in 1920, at the age of 84. In 1923, Thomazine was elected to Fellowship of the Royal Astronomical Society. She remained with the Observatory, and regularly hosted scientists and fellow astronomers at her home.

Thomazine Mary Lockyer died on 9 September 1943, aged 91. She was buried in Salcombe Regis, Devon. Her Royal Astronomical Society obituary read:

To the last she led an active life, her mind was undimmed and she took a great interest in all the affairs of the day. She was possessed of a rare and outstanding charm and her many friends will always remember her with deep affection.
