= Scoresby Bay =

Bay in Nunavut, Canada

- Location within Nunavut
- Location: Nares Strait
- Coordinates: 79°56′N 71°10′W
- Basin countries: Canada
- Settlements: Uninhabited

Scoresby Bay is an Arctic waterway in Qikiqtaaluk Region, Nunavut, Canada. It is located in Nares Strait by eastern Ellesmere Island's Darling Peninsula, west of Nunatami, Greenland.

The bay is named in honour of William Scoresby, an English Arctic explorer and scientist.

== Geography ==
The area is characterized as a flood plain of gravel and silt.
