= Isabel de Bohun Lockyer =

British artist

- Born: 1895
- Died: 1980 (aged 84–85)
- Other names: I. de B. Lockyer
- Occupation: Artist
- Years active: 1924–1938
- Known for: Linocut prints

Isabel de Bohun Lockyer (1895–1980) was a British painter known for her linocut color prints. She worked as an independent artist and mostly depicted landscapes.

== Career ==
Lockyer was one of the few linocut artists at the time who was not associated with the Grosvenor School, a collection of artists and students who were primarily responsible for a resurgence of interest in printmaking and particularly linocut after World War I. Her earlier work followed closely in the tradition of woodcut due to her use of water-based inks, but later her technique showed influence from the work of Claude Flight, one of the heads of the Grosvenor School, who invited her to exhibit her prints at some of his annual British linocut exhibitions during the 1930s. Lockyer's work was also exhibited from 1925–1938 in association with the Society of Painter-Gravers.

Most of Lockyer's prints are landscapes, several of which feature scenic views from Switzerland, Dalmatia, and Corfu in addition to England. A few exceptions depict people engaged in various activities, such as The Cabaret Singer, The Shop Window, and The Path Finder.

== List of works ==
Lockyer's works have been auctioned off, purchased by private collectors, and kept in the collections of various museums.

- Near Vevey (1924)
- Château de Blonay (1924)
- Afterglow Bordigliera (1925)
- Château de la Tour Vevey (1925)
- Château de la Tour Vevey (1926)
- Château de Gruyères (1926), in the collection of the Minneapolis Institute of Art
- Komiža, Dalmatia (1930)
- The Cabaret Singer (1930), in the collection of the Auckland Art Museum
- The Shop Window (1930)
- Twilight in Dalmatia (1931)
- Wembury Church, South Devon (1931)
- Baroque Fountain, Dalmatia (1933)
- The Striped Sail (1933), in the collection of the Metropolitan Museum of Art
- Cold Evening (1933), available for purchase from the Josef Lebovic Gallery
- Sunlight on Korcula (1933)
- The Path Finder (1934)
- Back Yard Picnic (1935), in the collection of the Auckland Art Museum
- Autumn Colors (Undated)
