= Norman Lockyer =

English scientist and astronomer (1836–1920)

Sir Norman Lockyer KCB FRS
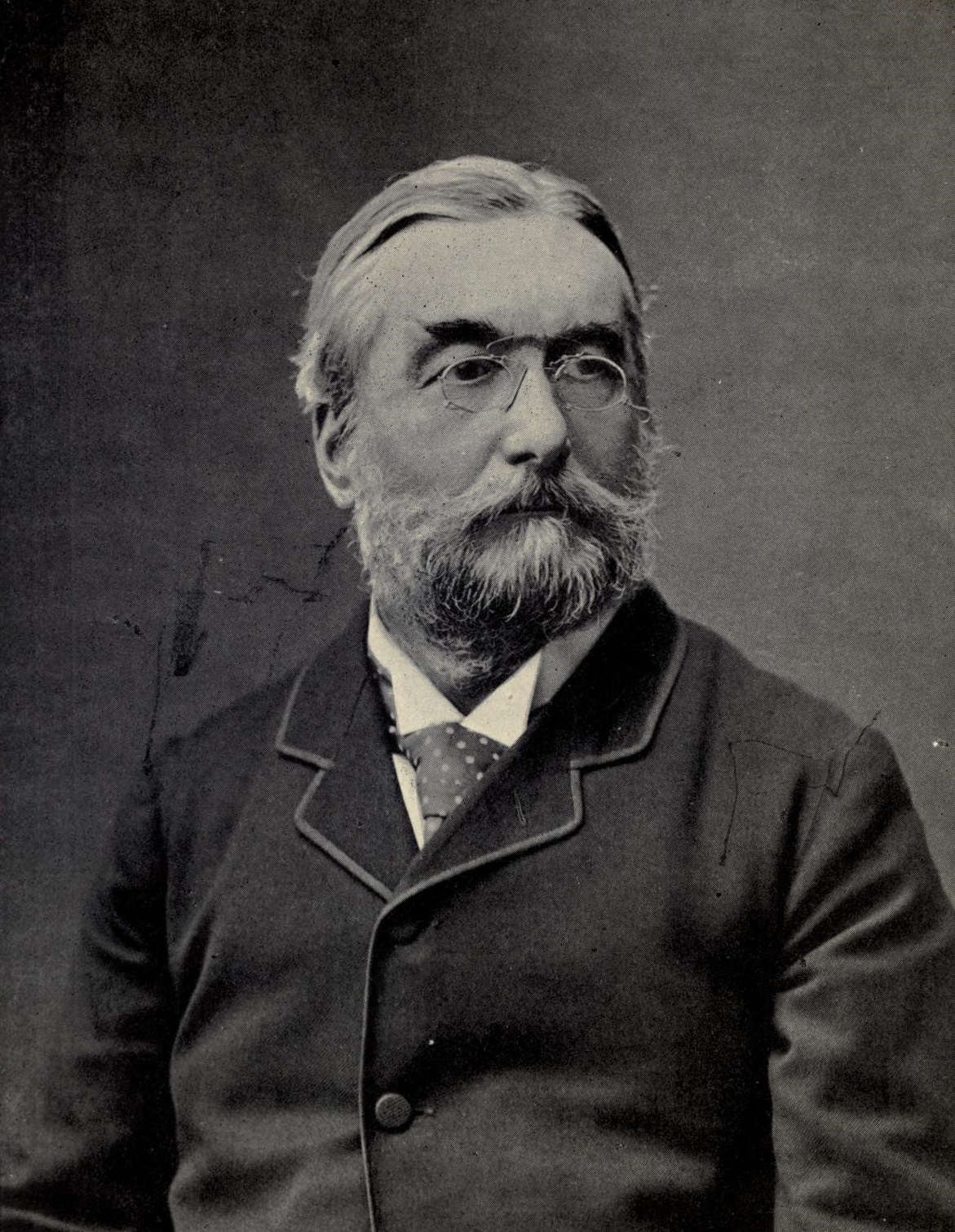
- Born: Joseph Norman Lockyer; 17 May 1836; Rugby, Warwickshire, England
- Died: 16 August 1920 (aged 84); Salcombe Regis, Devon, England
- Known for: Discovering helium; Founding Nature
- Awards: Rumford Medal (1874); Janssen Medal (1889)
- Scientific career
- Fields: Astronomy
- Workplaces: Imperial College London
- Notable students: Alfred Fowler

Sir Joseph Norman Lockyer (17 May 1836 – 16 August 1920) was an English scientist and astronomer. Simultaneously, with the French scientist Pierre Janssen, he developed a new spectroscopic method for analysing solar flares in a laboratory. Sir Norman is credited with discovering the gas helium. Lockyer also is remembered for being the founder and first editor of the influential journal Nature.

== Biography ==
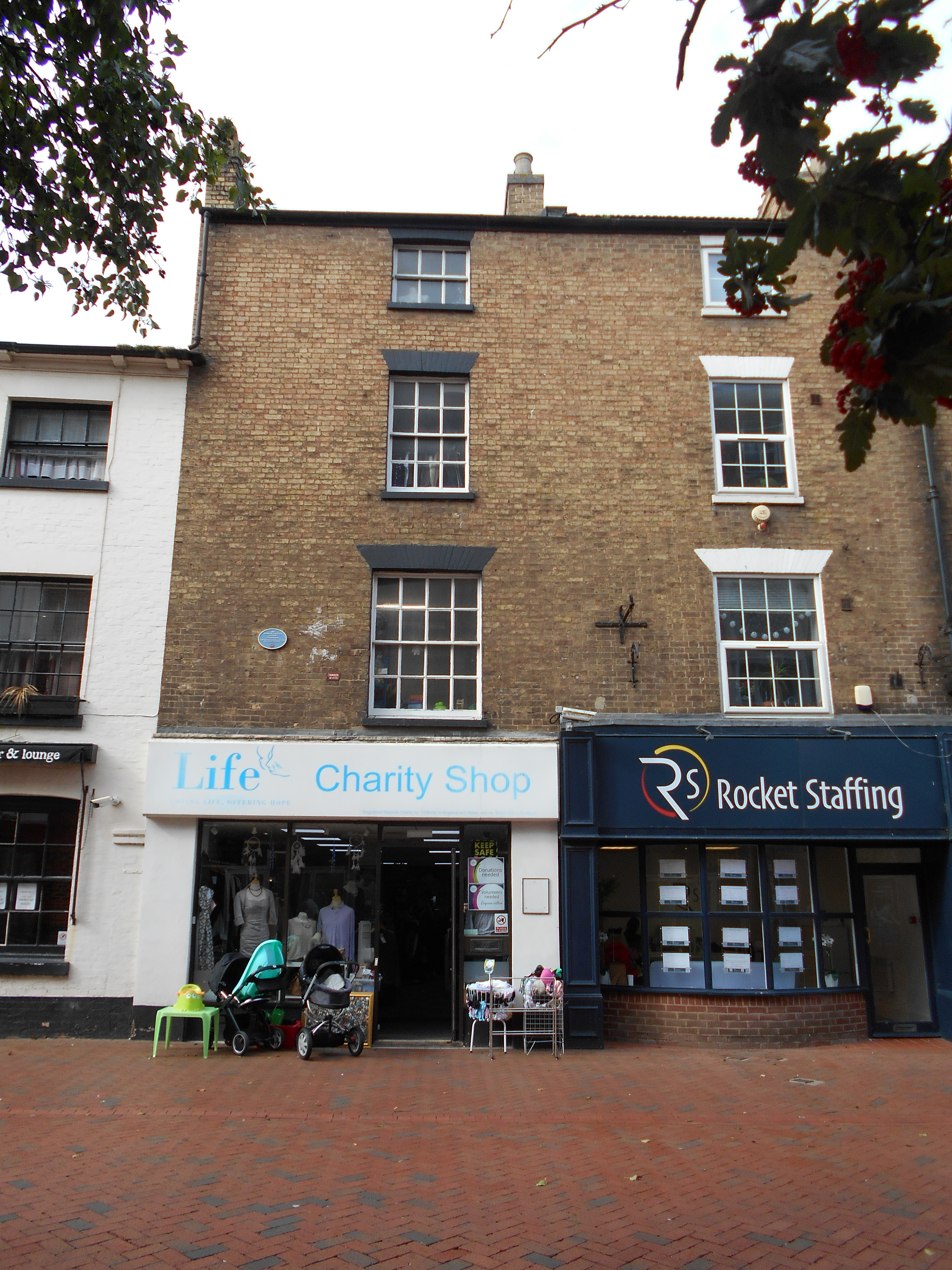
This building on Sheep Street, Rugby was Lockyer's birthplace, as is declared by a blue plaque

Lockyer was born in Rugby, Warwickshire. His early introduction to science was through his father, who was a pioneer of the electric telegraph. After a conventional schooling supplemented by travel in Switzerland and France, he worked for some years as a civil servant in the British War Office. He settled in Wimbledon, South London after marrying Winifred James, who helped translate at least four French scientific works into English. He was a keen amateur astronomer with a particular interest in the Sun. In 1885 he became the world's first professor of astronomical physics at the Royal College of Science, South Kensington, now part of Imperial College. At the college, the Solar Physics Observatory was built for him and here he directed research until 1913.

In the 1860s Lockyer became fascinated by electromagnetic spectroscopy as an analytical tool for determining the composition of heavenly bodies. He conducted his research from his new home in West Hampstead, with a 6 1/4-inch telescope which he had already used in Wimbledon.

In 1868 a prominent yellow line was observed in a spectrum taken near the edge of the Sun. Its wavelength was about 588 nm, slightly less than the so-called "D" lines of sodium. The line could not be explained as due to any material known at the time, and so it was suggested by Lockyer, after he had observed it from London, that the yellow line was caused by an unknown solar element. He named this element helium after the Greek word ἥλιος (helios) meaning 'sun'. An observation of the new yellow line had been made earlier by Janssen at the 18 August 1868 solar eclipse , and because their papers reached the French academy on the same day, he and Lockyer usually are awarded joint credit for helium's discovery. Terrestrial helium was found about 27 years later by the Scottish chemist William Ramsay. In his work on the identification of helium, Lockyer collaborated with the noted chemist Edward Frankland.

To facilitate the transmission of ideas between scientific disciplines, Lockyer established the general science journal Nature in 1869. He was elected as a member of the American Philosophical Society in 1874. He remained its editor until shortly before his death.

Lockyer led eight expeditions to observe solar eclipses, for example in 1870 to Sicily (with his first wife Winifred as his assistant), 1871 to India and 1898 to India.

Lockyer is among the pioneers of archaeoastronomy. Travelling 1890 in Greece he noticed the east–west orientation of many temples, in Egypt he found an orientation of temples to sunrise at midsummer and towards Sirius. Assuming orientation of the Heel-Stone of Stonehenge to sunrise at midsummer he calculated the construction of the monument to have taken place in 1680 BC. Radiocarbon dating in 1952 gave a date of 1800 BC. He also confirmed the alignment of the Parthenon on the rising point of the Pleiades and did extensive work on the solar and stellar alignments of Egyptian temples and their dating, presented in his book The Dawn Of Astronomy.

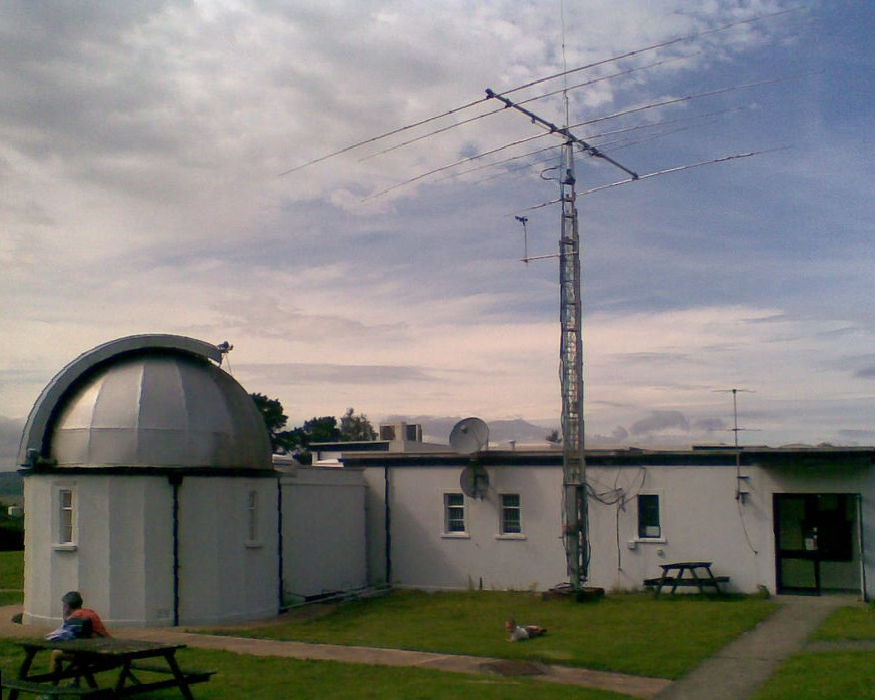
The Norman Lockyer Observatory

Lockyer's first wife Winifred née James died in 1879. They had six sons and two daughters in all. In 1903, Lockyer started a second marriage, to suffragist Thomazine Mary Brodhurst (née Browne). After his retirement in 1913, Lockyer established an observatory near his home in Salcombe Regis near Sidmouth, Devon. Originally known as the Hill Observatory, the site was renamed the Norman Lockyer Observatory after his death and directed by his fifth son William J.S. Lockyer. For a time the observatory was a part of the University of Exeter, but is now owned by the East Devon District Council, and run by the Norman Lockyer Observatory Society. The Norman Lockyer Chair in Astrophysics at the University of Exeter is currently held by Professor Tim Naylor, who is the member of the Astrophysics group there which studies star formation and extrasolar planets. Naylor was the lead scientist for the eSTAR Project.

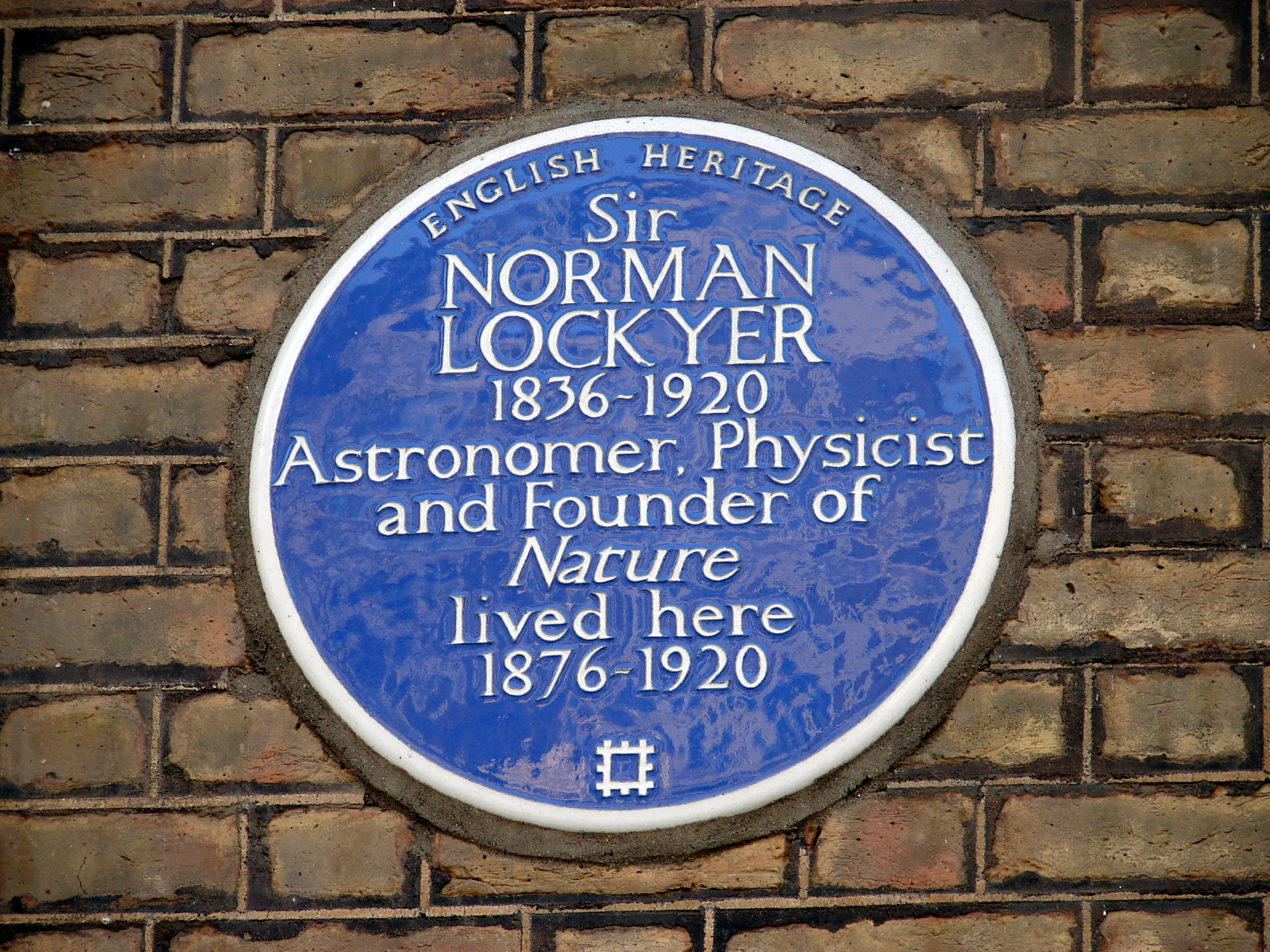
English Heritage plaque in Penywern Road, Earls Court, London.

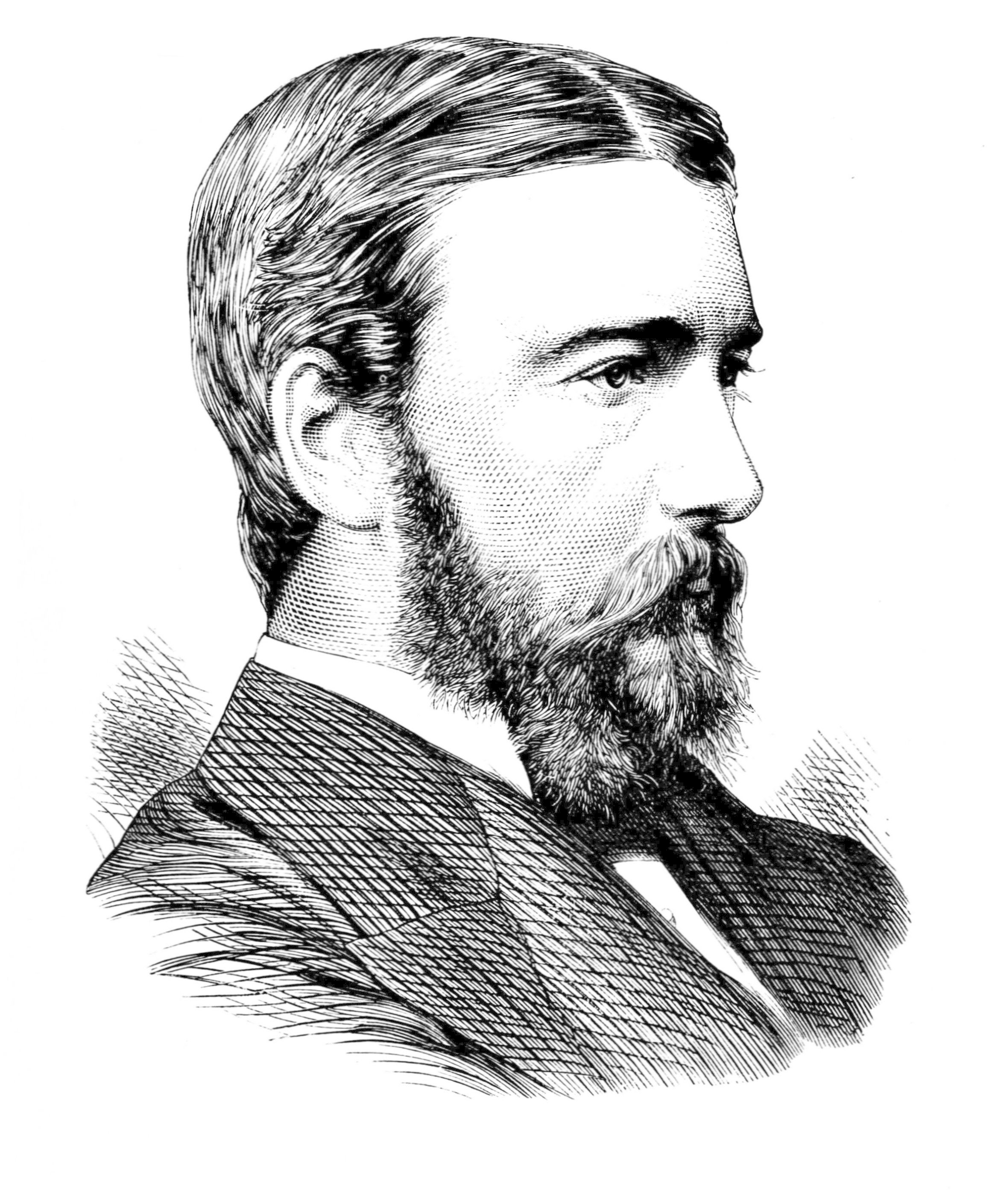
1873 illustration of Lockyer.

Lockyer died at his home in Salcombe Regis in 1920, and was buried there in the churchyard of St Peter and St Mary.

== Publications ==
- J. Norman Lockyer (1870). Questions on Lockyer's Elementary Lessons in Astronomy: For the Use of Schools. Macmillan, 1870 (Macmillan's School Class Books). Joint author: John Forbes-Robertson.
- J. Norman Lockyer (1873). Elements of Astronomy: Accompanied with Numerous Illustration, a Colored Representation of the Solar, Stellar, and Nebular Spectra, and Celestial Charts of the Northern and the Southern Hemisphere. New York: D. Appleton and Company, 1873.
- Norman Lockyer (1874). Contributions to Solar Physics. Macmillan and co. (1873)
- Joseph Norman Lockyer (1873). The Spectroscope and Its Applications. Macmillan and Co. p. 1. (1873)
- Norman Lockyer; George Mitchell Seabroke (1878). Stargazing. Macmillan and co. (1878)
- Norman Lockyer (1878). Studies in Spectrum Analysis. C. K. Paul. (1878)
- J. Norman Lockyer (1880). Astronomy. Macmillan & Co. (Science Primers) (1880)
- Photograph of J. Norman Lockyer (1836-1920) by his daughter Winifred L. Lockyer (died 1934).
  Report to the Committee on Solar Physics on the Basic Lines Common to Spots and Prominences (1880)
- Joseph Norman Lockyer; Norman Lockyer (1887). The Movements of the Earth. Macmillan and co. (1887)
- Norman Lockyer (1887). The Chemistry of the Sun. Macmillan and co. (1887)
- Norman Lockyer (1889). Elementary Lessons in Astronomy. Macmillan and co. (1868–94)
- Norman Lockyer (1890). The Meteoritic Hypothesis. Macmillan. (1890)
- Penrose, F.C., (communicated by Joseph Norman Lockyer), The Orientation of Greek Temples, Nature, v.48, n.1228, 11 May 1893, pp. 42–43
- Norman Lockyer (1894). The Dawn of Astronomy. Cassell. (1894)
- Norman Lockyer; William Rutherford (1896). The Rules of Golf: Being the St. Andrews Rules for the Game. Macmillan & Co.
- Norman Lockyer (1897). The Sun's Place in Nature. The Macmillan Company. (1897)
- Recent and Coming Eclipses (1900)
- Norman Lockyer (1900). Inorganic Evolution as Studied by Spectrum Analysis. Macmillan and Co., Limited. p. 167. (1900)
- Norman Lockyer (1903). On the Influence of Brain Power on History. Macmillan and Co., Limited. (1903)
- Stonehenge and Other British Stone Monuments Astronomically Considered (1906; second edition, 1909)
- Norman Lockyer; Joseph Norman Lockyer (1906). Education and National Progress. Macmillan and co. (1907)
- Norman Lockyer; Joseph Norman Lockyer (1909). Surveying for Archaeologists. Macmillan and Co., Limited. (1909)
- Norman Lockyer; Winifred Lucas Lockyer (1910). Tennyson, as a Student and Poet of Nature. Macmillan. (1910)

== Honours and awards ==
- Fellow of the Royal Society (1869)
- Rumford Medal, Royal Society of London (1874)
- Honorary member, Manchester Literary and Philosophical Society, 1887
- Janssen Medal, Paris Academy of Sciences (1889)
- Knight Commander of the Order of the Bath (1897)
- Doctor of Laws (Honoris causa) from the University of Glasgow in early 1903.
- President, British Association (1903 – 1904)
- The crater Lockyer on the Moon and the crater Lockyer on Mars are both named after him, as is Norman Lockyer Island in Nunavut, Canada.

Preceded by Position created	Editor in Chief of Nature; 1869–1919	Succeeded by Sir Richard Gregory, 1st Baronet (1919–1939)
