= Darling Peninsula =

Peninsula in Nunavut, Canada

Coordinates: 79°45′N 072°25′W

The Darling Peninsula is located on the eastern coast of Ellesmere Island, a part of the Qikiqtaaluk Region of the Canadian territory of Nunavut. It stretches eastward into Nares Strait, north of Dobbin Bay. Mount Stevens lies in the center of the peninsula, Scoresby Bay is found on its central coast, and Cape Louis Napoleon is located at the end of the 32 km (20 mi) long peninsula.

The Geomagnetic North Pole is located on the Darling Peninsula.
