= Kensington Arcade =

The Kensington Arcade

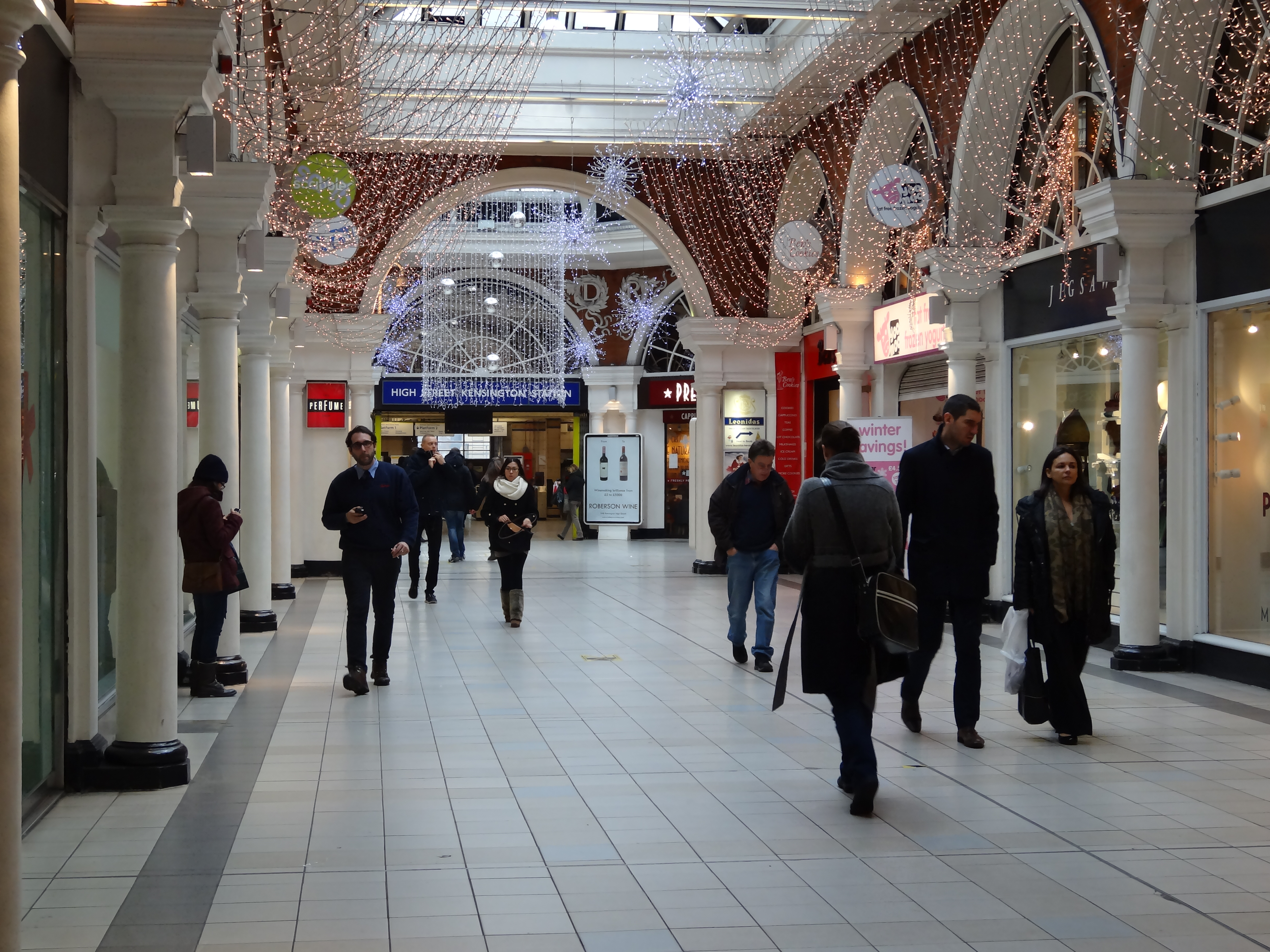
- Location: Kensington; London, W8; United Kingdom
- Coordinates: 51°30′2.98″N 0°11′32.06″W
- Owner: Meadow Partners
- Architect: George Campbell Sherrin
- Num. of stores: 15
- Floor area: 140,000 square feet (13,000 m^{2})
- Public transit: High Street Kensington
- Website: kensingtonarcade.co.uk

The Kensington Arcade is a shopping centre in Kensington, London, England. It is located on Kensington High Street. The entrance to High Street Kensington tube station is inside The Kensington Arcade.

== History ==
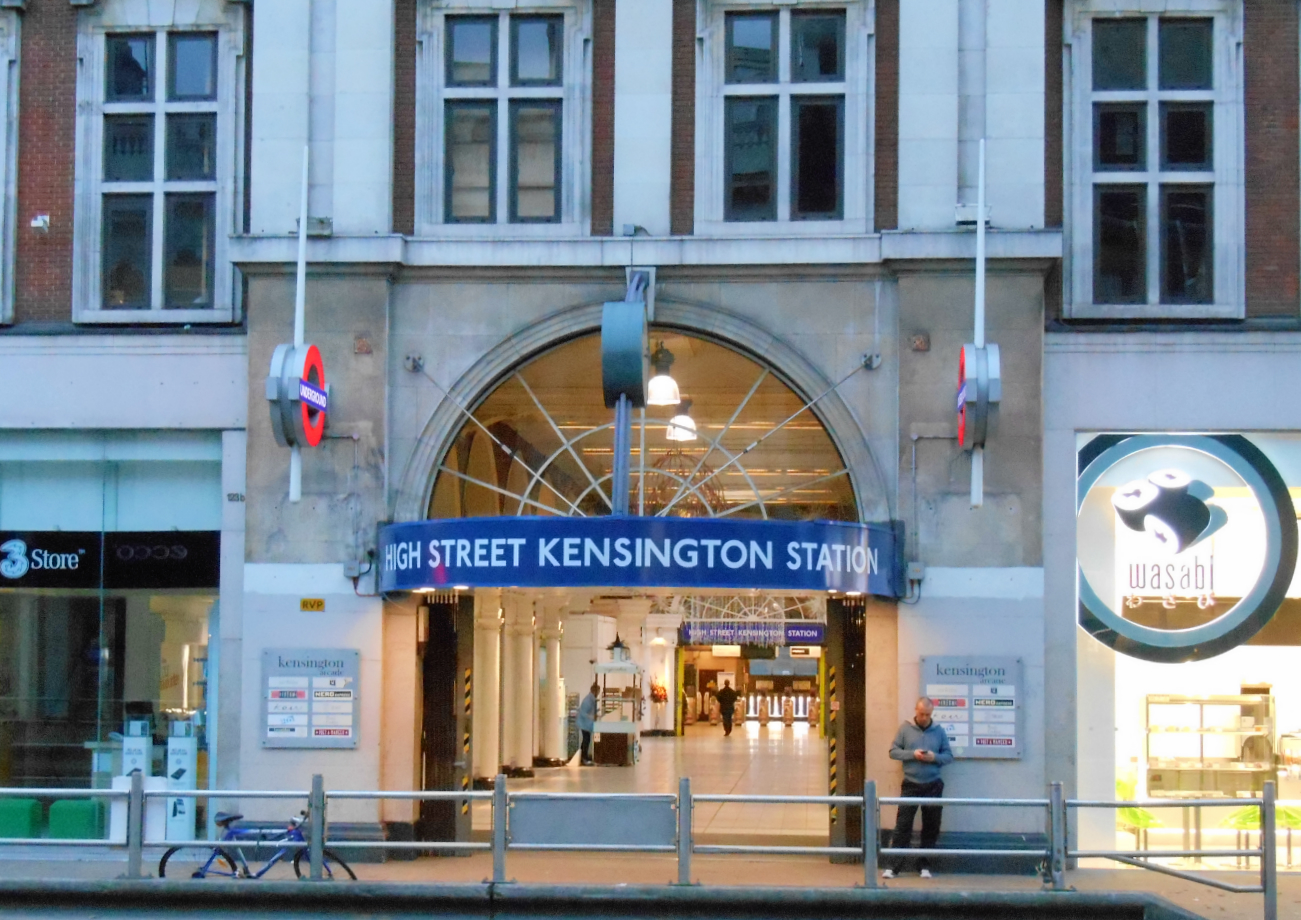
The main entrance to Kensington Arcade which includes the entrance to High Street Kensington station

The Arcade was built as part of the redevelopment of High Street Kensington tube station by the Metropolitan Railway between 1906 and 1907 from designs by their consultant architect, George Campbell Sherrin, with the neighbouring department stores, Pontings and Derry & Toms taking the store space.

In August 2000 it was revealed that MEPC plc was planning to sell its shopping centres, including Kensington Arcade, so the money can be reinvested in its business parks in South East England. It was expected to sell for £100 million.

Meadow Partners announced that it had completed a recapitalization of Kensington Arcade, costing £100 million, in March 2011. Meadow Partners also asked Paul Davis + Partners to look at the redevelopment of Kensington Arcade. Planning permission was obtained to combine the two shopping units.

In April 2013, Wasabi and Bill's Restaurant took two stores in Kensington Arcade. Kamps, a German bakery chain, opened two stores in London in 2013 – one on Tottenham Court Road and the other in Kensington Arcade.

== See also ==
- List of shopping centres in the United Kingdom
- Westfield London - a nearby shopping centre
- Victoria Station Arcade
- Royal Arcade, London
- Piccadilly Arcade
- Sicilian Avenue
- Woburn Walk
- Leadenhall Market
- Quadrant Arcade
