= Quadrant Arcade =

Shopping arcade in London

Coordinates: 51.510180°N 0.136777°W

Inside the arcade

Quadrant Arcade is a shopping arcade in the City of Westminster. It runs from the Quadrant of Regent Street in the south to Glasshouse Street in the north, running roughly parallel to Air Street.

== History and description ==
The arcade was first created between 1925 and 1927, with detailing provided by Gordon Jeeves. The arcade consisted of two-floor shops, the southern entrance integrated into the facade along Regent Street.

In 1972, the section of Regent Street and the arcade within were awarded Grade II listed status but in 2013. Nevertheless, the arcade was remodelled to allow for greater visibility and access from Regent Street, where previously it was bisected by a pillar. The new design put it in line with other shopping arcades of the West End such as Burlington Arcade. The northern end is now only accessible through a door.

== See also ==
- Burlington Arcade
- Royal Arcade
- Piccadilly Arcade
- Kensington Arcade
- Lowther Arcade
- Victoria Station Arcade
