= Sicilian Avenue =

Pedestrian shopping parade in Holborn, London

Coordinates: 51°31′6.55″N 0°7′16.74″W

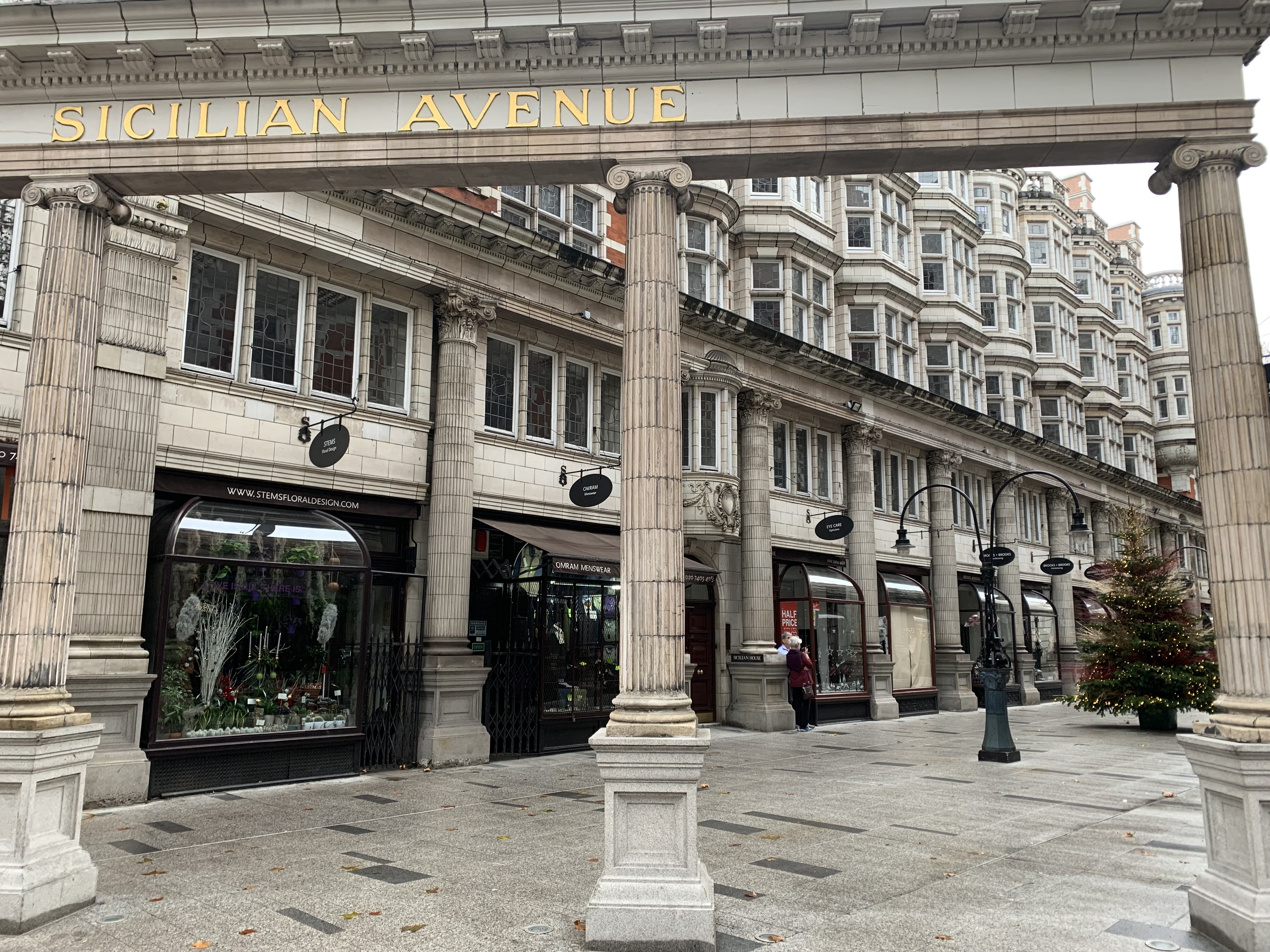
Sicilian Avenue

Sicilian Avenue is a Grade II listed, pedestrianised Edwardian avenue in Holborn, London, that runs diagonally between Southampton Row and Bloomsbury Way.

== History ==
Prior to redevelopment into its current state, the area contained shops and houses dating back to the 17th century. Development was made possible as land was cleared to widen what is now the A40, at the north/west end of the avenue.

Commissioned by the Bedford Estate and designed by Robert Worley, construction of Sicilian Avenue began in 1906 and concluded in 1910. The avenue is designed in a Baroque Revival style, using Italian marble and terracotta, with Italian and classical motifs, such as colonnades and turrets, throughout.

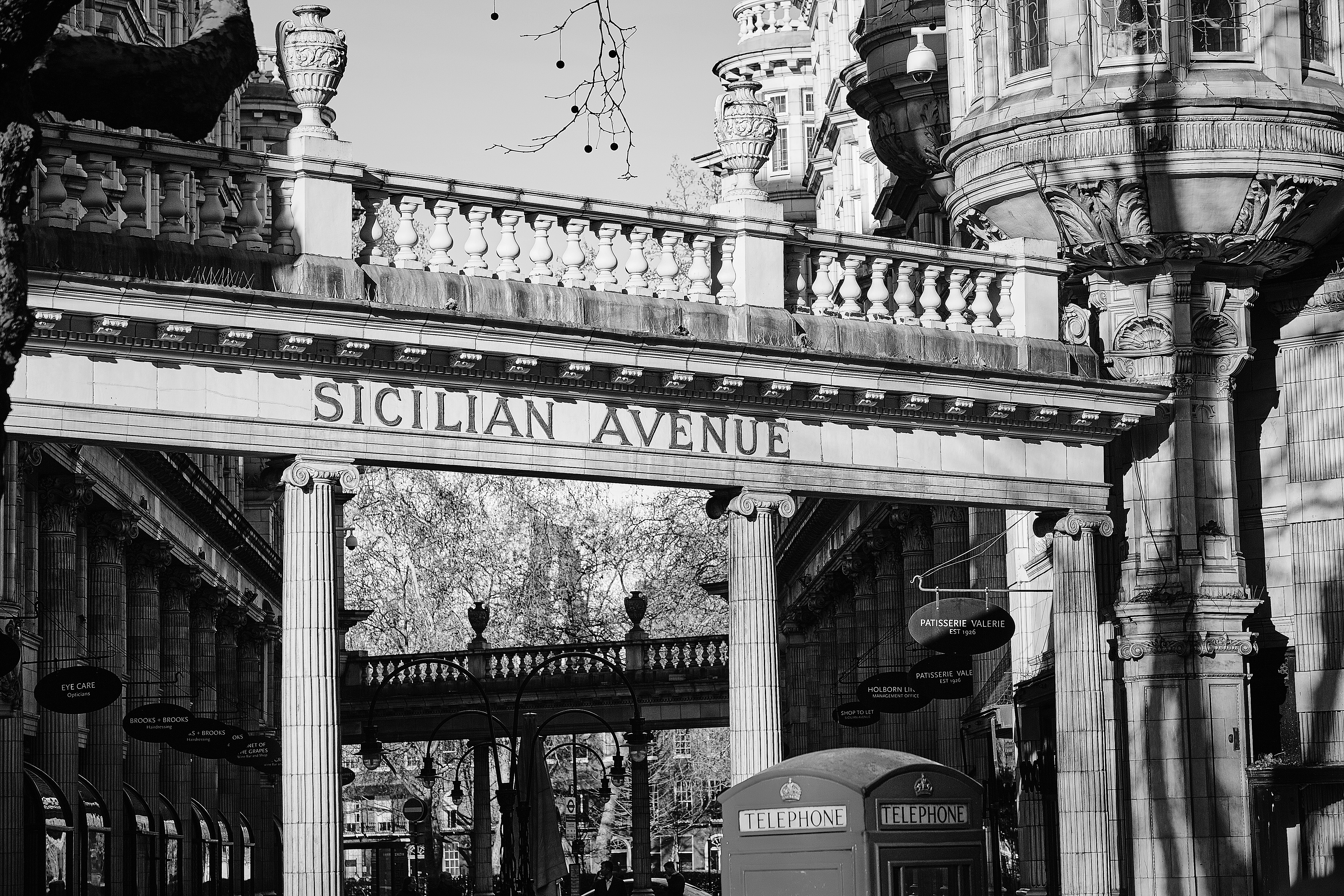
One of Sicilian Avenue's two entranceway colonnades

The avenue’s most distinctive feature are its two colonnades of Ionic order columns, one at either end of the avenue, each supporting an entablature with a balustrade supporting two ornate urns. The northwesternmost of these, at the avenue’s Bloomsbury Way entrance, comprises two columns with the end of each entablature terminating in and supported by the corner facades of 17 and 43 Sicilian Avenue. The colonnade at the avenue’s southeastern entrance on Southampton Row is free-standing, this time comprising four Ionic columns, again supporting an entablature and balustrade. The frieze of each colonnade is emblazoned with the name of the avenue in gold serif capitals.

The buildings that comprise Sicilian Avenue, including Vernon & Sicilian House, share the same design language, incorporating engaged columns along the facade. Unlike the colonnades at the avenue’s entrance, the engaged columns are of the composite order. Along both sides of the avenue and above the ground floor commercial units there are an additional four floors, the top three of which are decorated with terracotta bands. Originally constructed as residential apartments, these floors have been converted to office space.

Units 1–29, 6–20, 25–35 and 35A are listed Grade II on the National Heritage List for England. The three lamp posts located on Sicilian Avenue are also listed Grade II.

== Restoration ==
In 2020, real estate investment manager Tristan Capital Partners announced that its CCP 5 Long Life fund had purchased the Holborn Links Estate, which includes Sicilian Avenue, for £245 million.

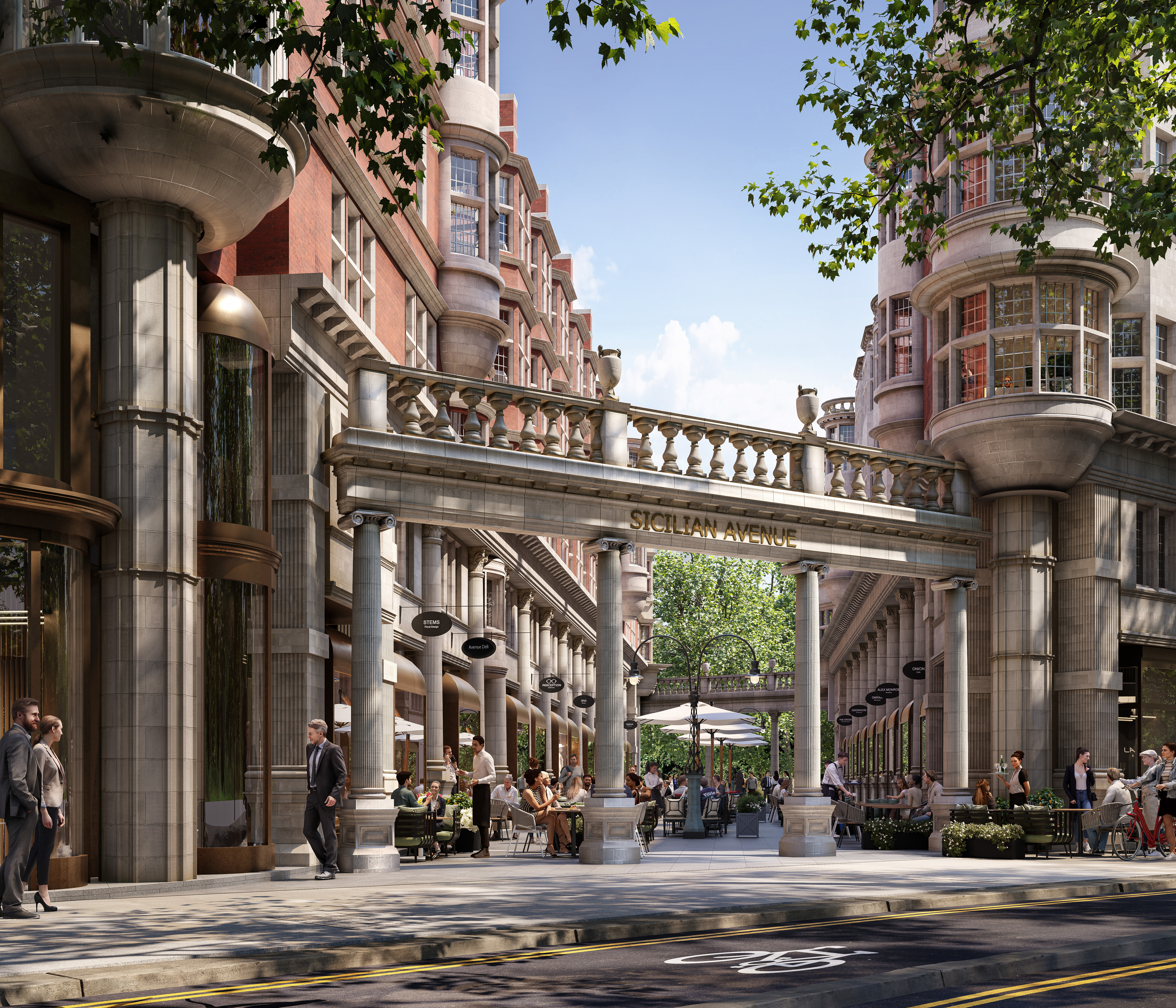
An architectural visualisation of the restored Sicilian Avenue

In 2023 it was announced that construction company Structure Tone had been selected to carry out the redevelopment of Sicilian Avenue, including the refurbishment of 21 Southampton Row, along with Vernon and Sicilian House, following designs by Hale Brown Architects Limited. The avenue is scheduled to reopen in summer 2025.

In the context of 21st century efforts to promote urban walkability, Sicilian Avenue has been cited as a historical example of an accessible pedestrianised street by cultural institutions such as Venice’s Museo Del Camminare.

Several scenes of the 2018 film The Guernsey Literary and Potato Peel Pie Society were filmed in Sicilian Avenue, as was a scene from the 2017 film Wonder Woman. The avenue has also served as a shooting location for the Apple TV spy drama Slow Horses.

== See also ==
- Listed buildings in the London Borough of Camden
- Woburn Walk
- Piccadilly Arcade
- Royal Arcade, London
- Burlington Arcade
- Leadenhall Market
