= Prince's Hall =

Coordinates: 51°30′30.9″N 0°8′15.7″W

Prince's Hall was a concert venue in Piccadilly, London.

It was part of the premises of the Royal Institute of Painters in Water Colours, at 190–195 Piccadilly, situated behind the galleries where annual exhibitions of the Institute took place. The building was opened by the Prince and Princess of Wales in 1883.

In 1900 the Prince's Hall was joined with the Prince's Hotel to the rear, and became a restaurant. Prince's Hotel, built about 1898, was at 36–38 Jermyn Street, which runs parallel to Piccadilly to the south. From 1929 to 1933 there was extensive alteration: the hotel was converted into offices and business premises, and Princes Arcade was constructed between Piccadilly and Jermyn Street.
