= Burlington House =

Building on Piccadilly in London, England

Coordinates: 51°30′32″N 0°8′22″W

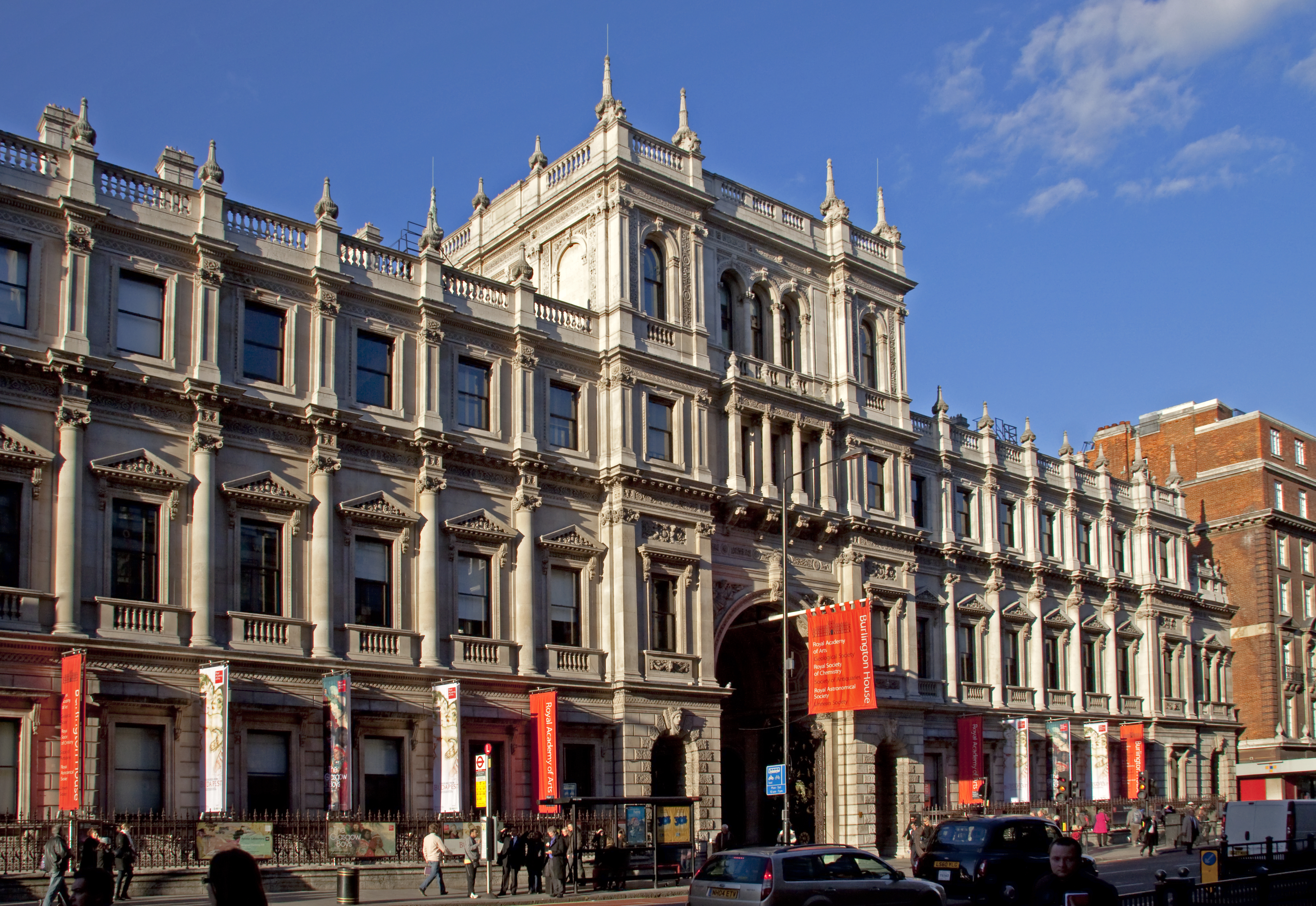
- The façade of Burlington House, 2010
- Interactive map of the Burlington House area

General information
- Architectural style: Neo-Palladian
- Location: Mayfair, London

Burlington House is a building on Piccadilly in Mayfair, London. It was originally a private English Baroque and then Neo-Palladian mansion owned by the Earls of Burlington. It was significantly expanded in the mid-19th century after being purchased by the British government. Today, the Royal Academy and five learned societies occupy much of the building.

== History ==
The house was one of the earliest of a number of very large private residences built on the north side of Piccadilly, previously a country lane, from the 1660s onwards. The first version was begun by Sir John Denham in about 1664. It was a red-brick double-pile hip-roofed mansion with a recessed centre, typical of the style of the time, or perhaps even a little old fashioned. Denham may have acted as his own architect, or he may have employed Hugh May, who certainly became involved in the construction after the house was sold in an incomplete state in 1667 to Richard Boyle, 1st Earl of Burlington, from whom it derives its name. Burlington had the house completed, which was the largest structure on his land, the Burlington Estate.

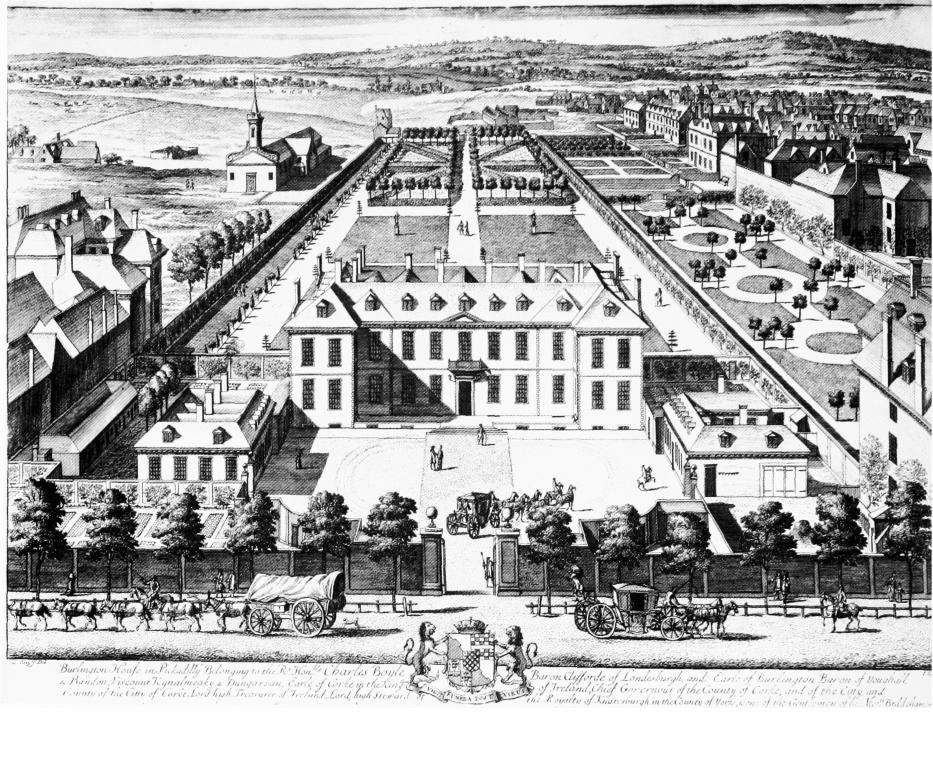
Burlington House from Jan Kip and Leonard Knyff's Britannia Illustrata, 1707

In 1704, the house was passed on to ten-year-old Richard Boyle, 3rd Earl of Burlington, who was to become the principal patron of the Neo-Palladian movement in England, and an architect in his own right. Around 1709, during Burlington's minority, Lady Juliana Boyle, the second Countess, commissioned James Gibbs to reconfigure the staircase and make exterior alterations to the house, including a quadrant Doric colonnade which was later praised by Sir William Chambers as "one of the finest pieces of architecture". The colonnade separated the house from increasingly urbanized Piccadilly with a cour d'honneur. Inside, Baroque decorative paintings in the entrance hall and a staircase by Sebastiano Ricci and Giovanni Antonio Pellegrini makes it one of the richest interiors in London.

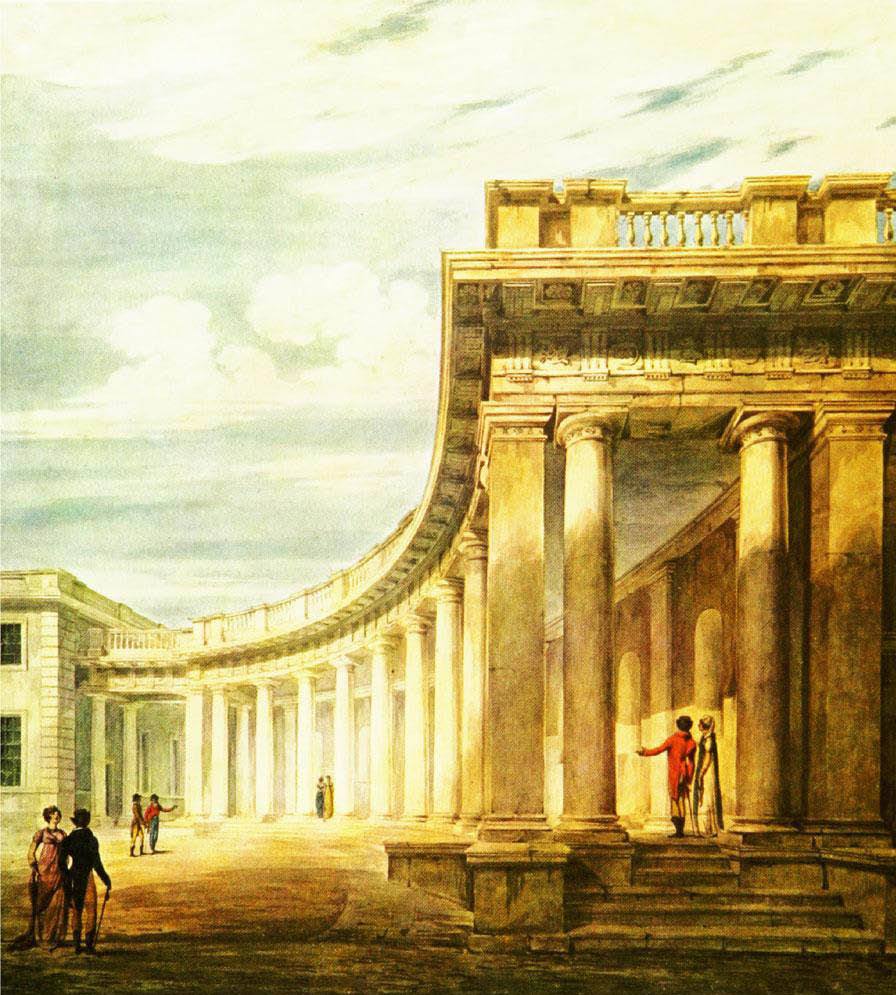
One of James Gibbs's colonnades at Burlington, functioning as a wall to enclose the house from the street, in watercolour c. 1806–08. (later demolished)

In between his two Grand Tours of Italy (1714 and 1719), the 3rd Earl of Burlington's taste was transformed by the publication of Giacomo Leoni's Palladio, which made him develop a passion for Palladian architecture. In 1717 or 1718, the young Lord Burlington began making major modifications to Burlington House, and the supervision of the work was undertaken by Gibbs.

Later, Colen Campbell was appointed to replace Gibbs, who was working in the Baroque style of Sir Christopher Wren, to recast the work in a new manner on the old foundation. This was a key moment in the history of English architecture, as Campbell's work was in a strict Palladian style. The aesthetic preferences of Campbell and Burlington, soon joined by the aesthetic style of their close associate William Kent (who worked on interiors at Burlington House), were to provide the leading strain in English architecture and interior decoration for two generations.

Campbell's work closely followed the form of the previous building and reused much of the structure, but the conventional front (south) façade was replaced with an austere two-storey composition, taking Palladio's Palazzo Iseppo di Porti in Vicenza for a model but omitting sculpture and substituting a balustrade for the attic storey. The ground floor became a rusticated basement, which supported a monumental piano nobile of nine bays. This had no centrepiece but was highlighted by venetian windows in the projecting end bays, the first to be seen in England. Other alterations included a monumental screening gateway to Piccadilly and the reconstruction of most of the principal interiors, with typical Palladian features such as rich coved ceilings.

The Saloon, constructed immediately after William Kent's return from Rome in December 1719, has survived in the most intact condition; it was the first Kentian interior designed in England. Its plaster putti above the pedimented doorcases were probably by Giovanni Battista Guelfi.

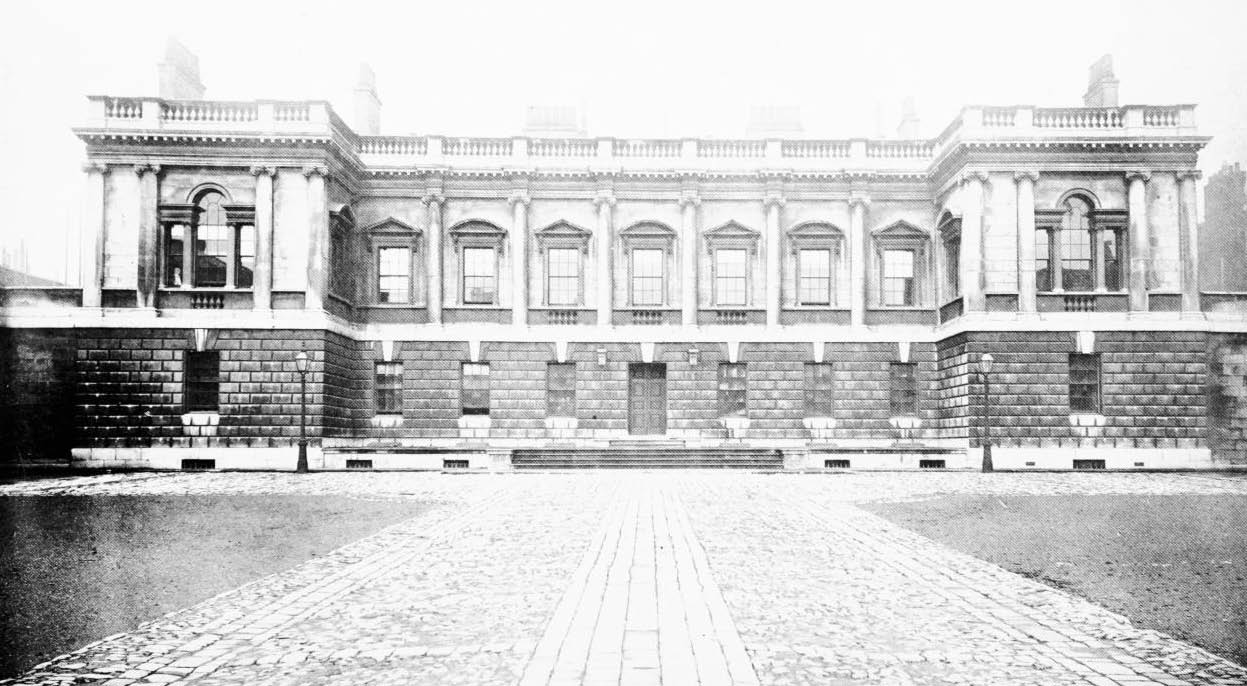
Photograph of the original main block of Burlington House, before the addition of the top storey; the facade dated from 1725 and was designed by Colen Campbell.

Lord Burlington transferred his architectural energies to Chiswick House after 1722. Upon Burlington's death in 1753, Burlington House was passed on to the Dukes of Devonshire, but they had no need of it as they already owned Devonshire House just along Piccadilly. The fourth Duke's younger son Lord George Cavendish and a Devonshire in-law, William Cavendish-Bentinck, 3rd Duke of Portland, each used the house for at least two separate periods. Portland had some of the interiors altered by John Carr in the 1770s.

Eventually Lord George, who was a rich man in his own right due to having married an heiress, purchased the house from his nephew, William Cavendish, 6th Duke of Devonshire, for £70,000 in 1815. Lord George employed Samuel Ware to shift the staircase to the centre and reshape the interiors to provide a suite of "Fine Rooms" en enfilade, linking the new state dining room at the west end to the new ballroom at the east end. Like Carr's work, Ware's was sympathetic with the Palladian style of the house, providing an early example of the "Kent Revival", a particularly English prefiguration of Baroque Revival architecture. In 1819, the Burlington Arcade was built along the western part of the grounds.

In 1854, Burlington House was sold to the British government for £140,000, originally with the plan of demolishing the building and using the site to build the University of London. This plan, however, was abandoned in the face of strong opposition. In 1857, Burlington House was occupied by the scientifically focused, Royal Society, the Linnean Society, and the Chemical Society (later the Royal Society of Chemistry).

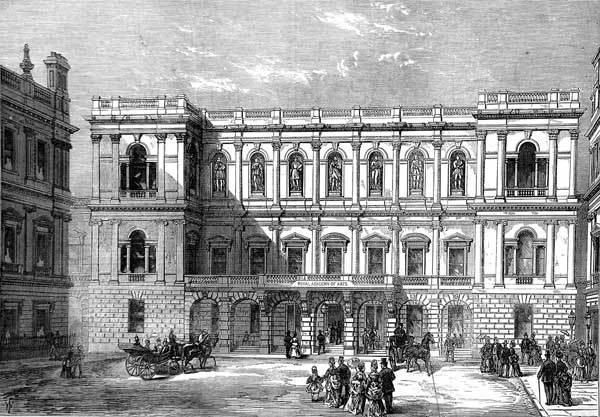
The façade of the original main block in the 1870s, showing additional storey and colonnade added as part of the expansion of the complex

The Royal Academy of Arts took over the main block in 1867 on a 999-year lease, with rent of £1 per year. It was required to pay for its top-lit main art galleries, designed by Sidney Smirke on a part of the gardens to the north of the main range and its art school premises; Smirke also raised the central block with a third storey. The former east and west service wings on either side of the courtyard and the wall and gate to Piccadilly were replaced by much more voluminous wings by the partnership of Robert Richardson Banks and Charles Barry Jr., in an approximation of Campbell's style. These were completed in 1873, and the three societies moved into these. In 1874, they were joined by the Geological Society of London, the Royal Astronomical Society and the Society of Antiquaries.

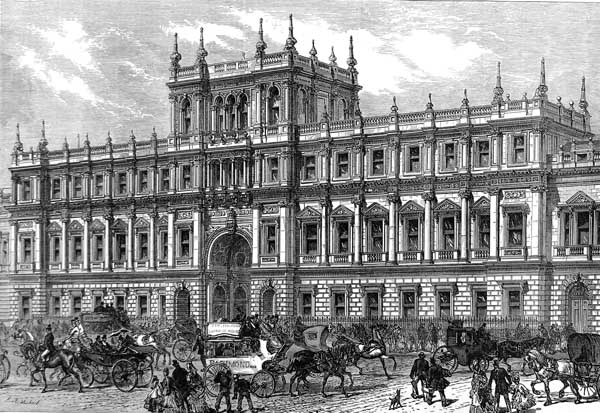
The street façade of the Piccadilly wing

This arrangement lasted until 1968, when the Royal Society moved to new premises in Carlton House Terrace, and its apartments were split between the Royal Society of Chemistry and the British Academy. The British Academy also moved to Carlton House Terrace in 1998, and the Royal Society of Chemistry took over the rest of the east wing.

In 2004, the Courtyard Societies went to court against the Office of the Deputy Prime Minister over the terms of their tenure of the apartments in Burlington House, which they have enjoyed rent-free. The dispute was sent to mediation, after which the following statement was released: "The Office of the Deputy Prime Minister and the Learned Societies had a very constructive meeting on 16 March which envisages the continued presence of the Learned Societies at Burlington House. Discussions are continuing with a view to formalising the arrangement on a basis which is acceptable to all parties."

In August 2019, the MHCLG (the successor body to the Office of the Deputy Prime Minister) gave formal notice to the Courtyard Societies that by 2022 they would have to pay commercial rents for the premises at Burlington House. The imposition of higher rents on the Courtyard Societies who are reliant on charitable funds and membership income was set to bankrupt them unless they leave, effectively ending 150 years of joint intellectual effort and public scientific meetings at Burlington House. After several years of negotiations, the Courtyard Societies and MHCLG agreed a 999-year lease for the building in March 2024, with the Geological Society paying £5.5 million in instalments over 10 years for their share.

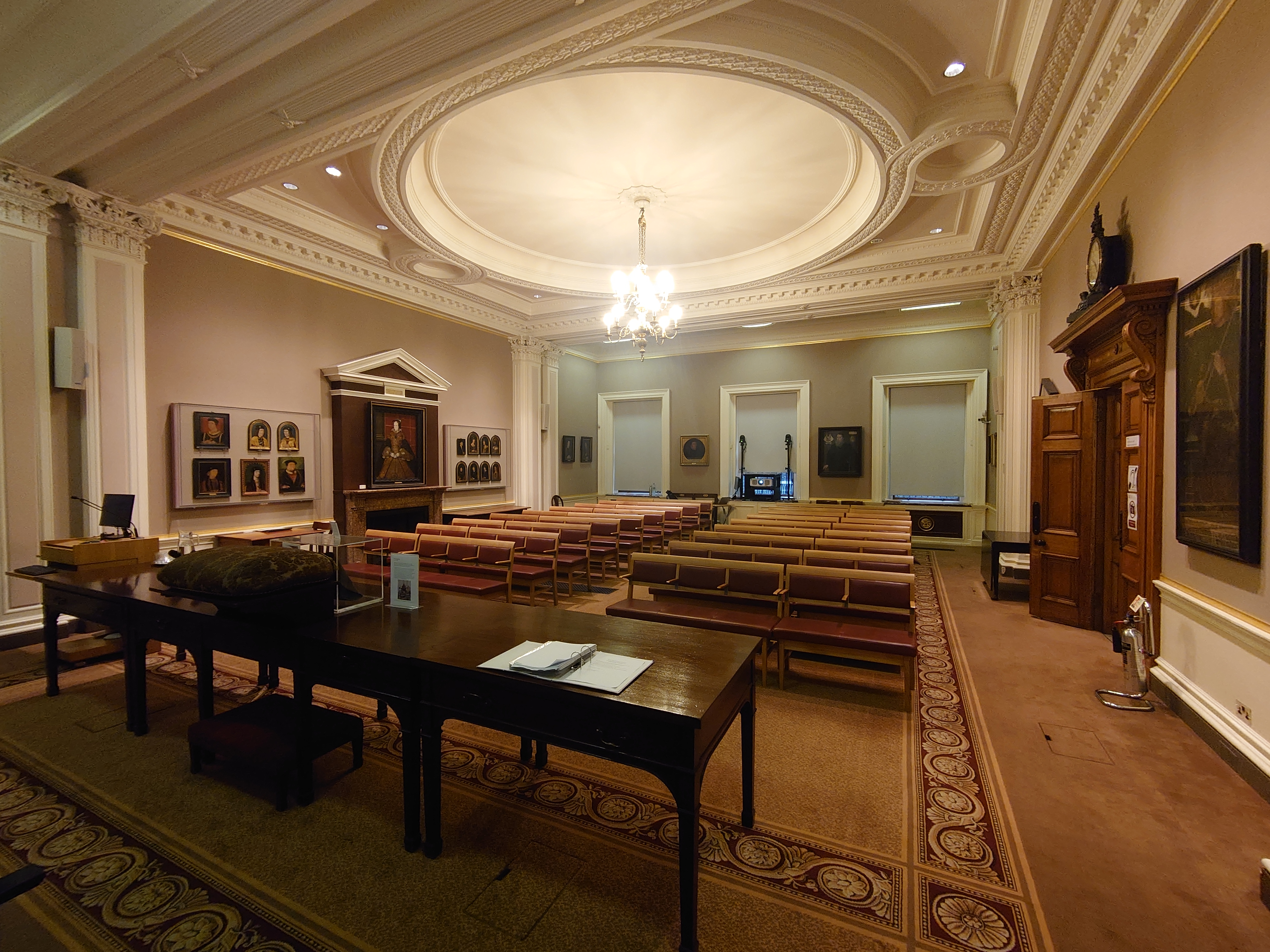
One of the rooms in the west wing used by the Society of Antiquaries

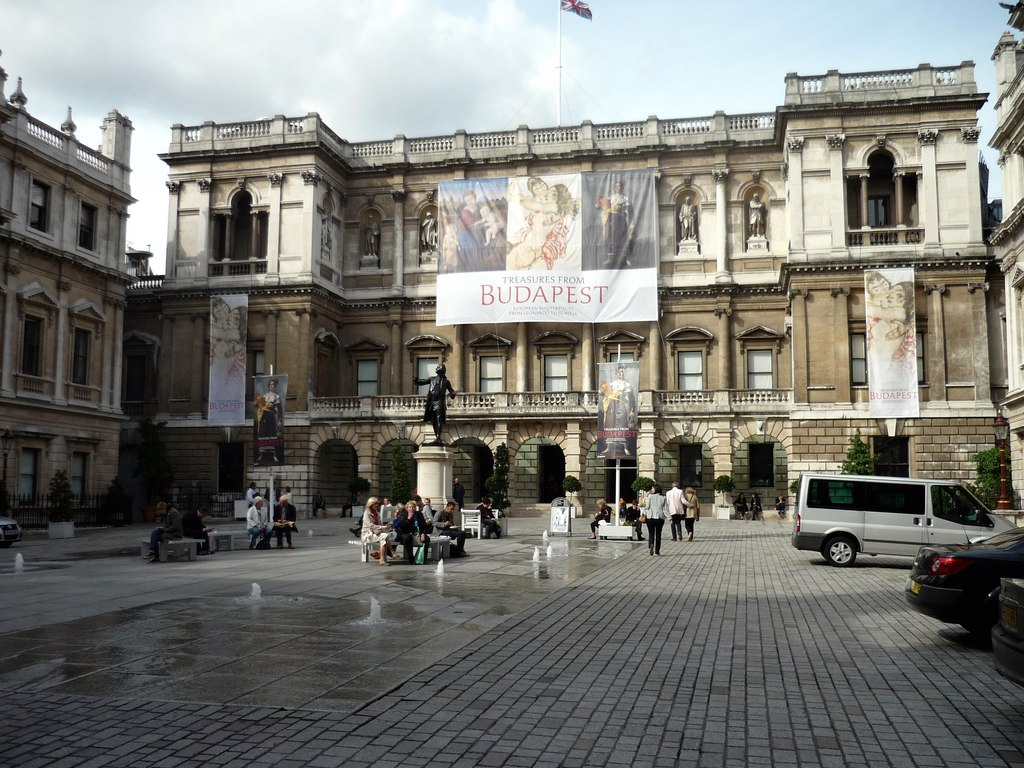
The courtyard of Burlington House

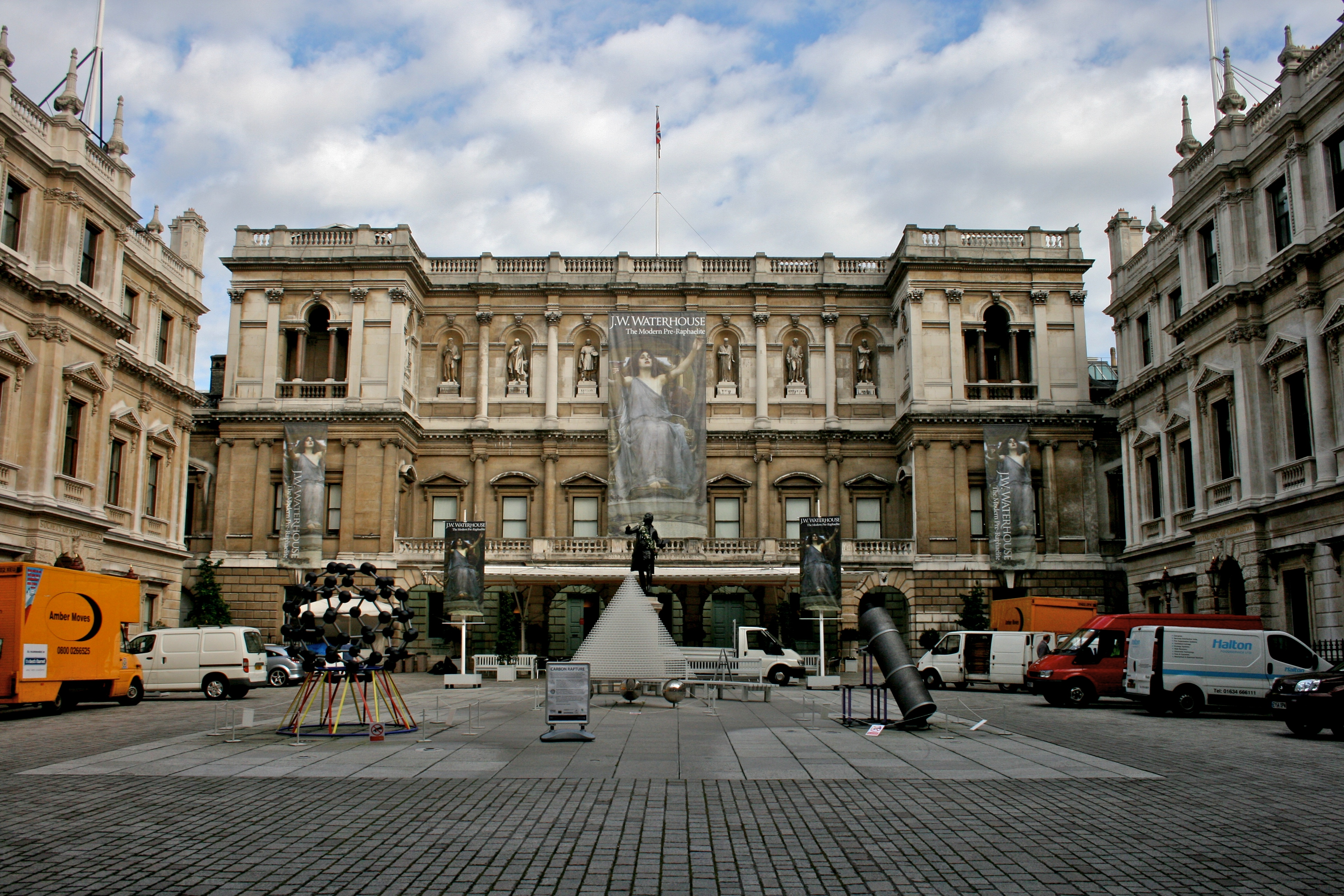
Sometimes the courtyard hosts temporary sculptures or exhibitions, such as this one in 2009

== Present occupants ==
Burlington House is most familiar to the general public as the venue for art exhibitions from the Royal Academy. The academy is housed in the main building at the northern end of the courtyard. Five learned societies occupy the two wings on the east and west sides of the courtyard and the Piccadilly wing at the southern end. Collectively known as the Courtyard Societies, these societies are:

- Geological Society of London (Piccadilly/east wing)
- Linnean Society of London (Piccadilly/west wing)
- Royal Astronomical Society (west wing)
- Society of Antiquaries of London (west wing)
- Royal Society of Chemistry (east wing)

Burlington House has been listed Grade II* on the National Heritage List for England since February 1970.

== Public access ==
The courtyard of Burlington House, known as the "Annenberg Courtyard", is open to the public during the day. It features a statue of Joshua Reynolds and fountains arranged in the pattern of the planets at the time of his birth.

The wooden prototype K2 telephone box, designed by Sir Giles Gilbert Scott, has been located in the entrance to the courtyard since 1924; In 2019, it was listed to Grade II* in "recognition of its iconic design status".

The Royal Academy's public art exhibitions are staged in nineteenth-century additions to the main block which are of little architectural interest. However, in 2004 the principal reception rooms on the piano nobile were opened to the public after restoration as the "John Madejski Fine Rooms". They contain many of the principal works in the academy's permanent collection, which predominantly features works by Royal Academicians and small temporary exhibitions drawn from the collection. The east, west and Piccadilly wings are occupied by the learned societies and are generally not open to the public unless for attending public lectures or academic exhibitions by appointment.

== See also ==
- Burlington Estate
- 6 Burlington Gardens
