= Burlington Arcade =

Covered shopping arcade in London

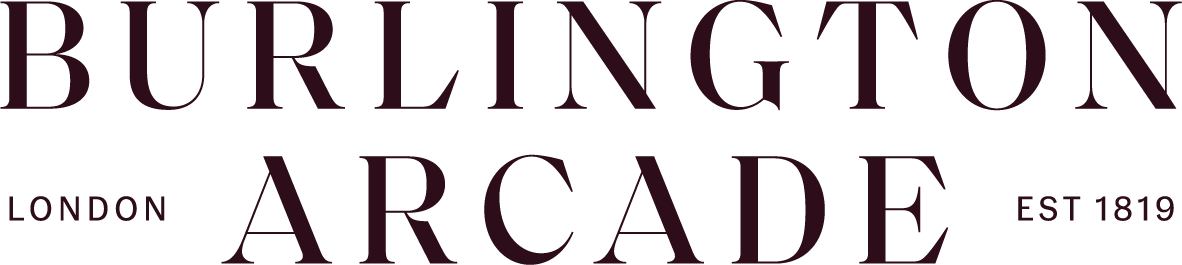

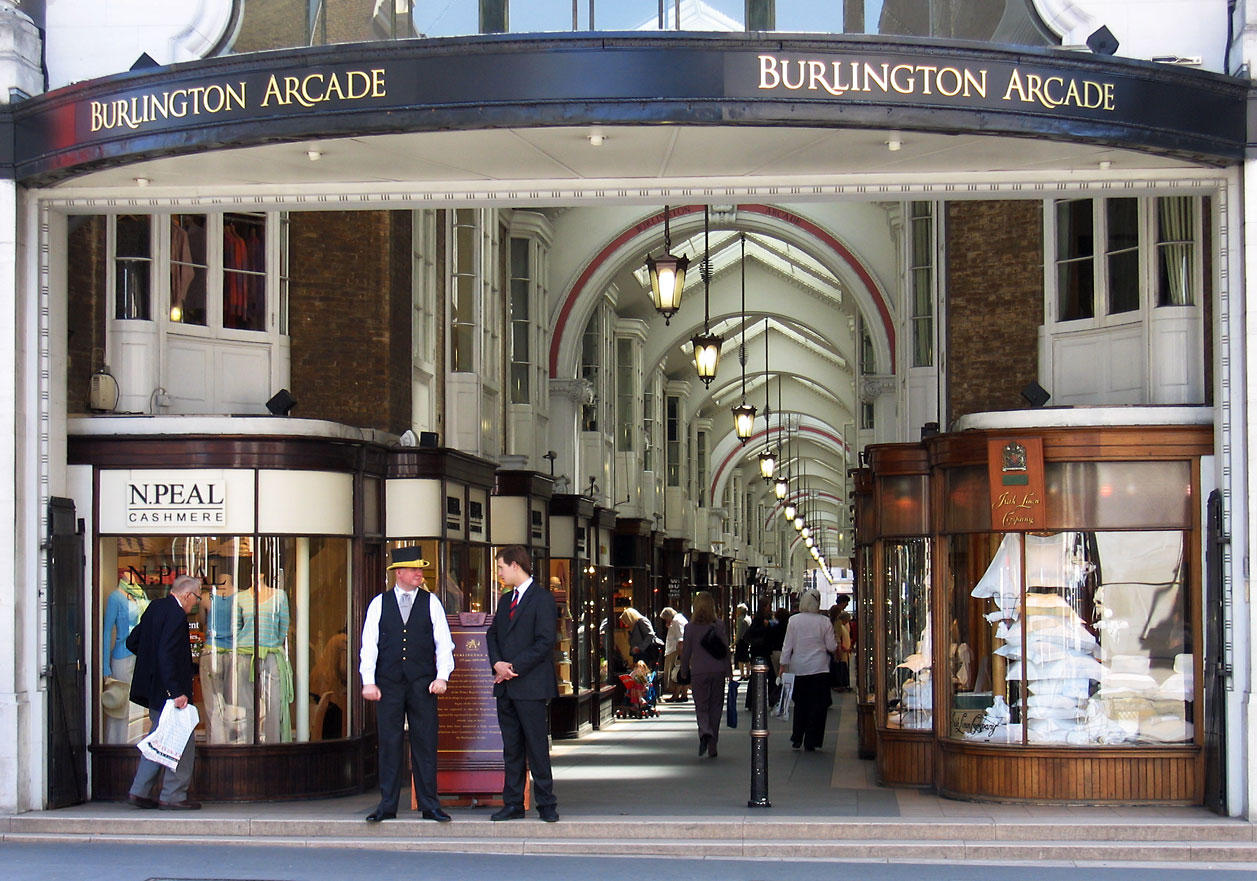
- North entrance to the Burlington Arcade, with beadle in attendance
- Location: London, England, United Kingdom
- Coordinates: 51.5090°N 0.1403°W
- Opened: 20 March 1819; 207 years ago
- Developer: George Cavendish, 1st Earl of Burlington
- Owner: David and Simon Reuben
- Num. of stores: 40
- Website: www.burlingtonarcade.com

Burlington Arcade is a covered shopping arcade in the City of Westminster, England, United Kingdom. It is 196 yards (179 m) long, parallel to and east of Bond Street from Piccadilly to Burlington Gardens. It is a precursor to the mid-19th-century European shopping gallery and the world's first modern shopping mall. It is near the similar Piccadilly Arcade.

The arcade was built in 1818 to the order of George Cavendish, 1st Earl of Burlington, on what had been the side garden of the adjacent Burlington House. His older brother, William Cavendish, 5th Duke of Devonshire, who had inherited of the house, was reputed to prevent passers-by throwing oyster shells and other rubbish over the wall of his home. Architect Samuel Ware designed it. Burlington Arcade was built "for the sale of jewellery and fancy articles of fashionable demand, for the gratification of the public." However, it was also said to have been built so the Lord's wife could shop safely amongst other genteel ladies and gentlemen away from London's busy, dirty, and crime-ridden open streets.

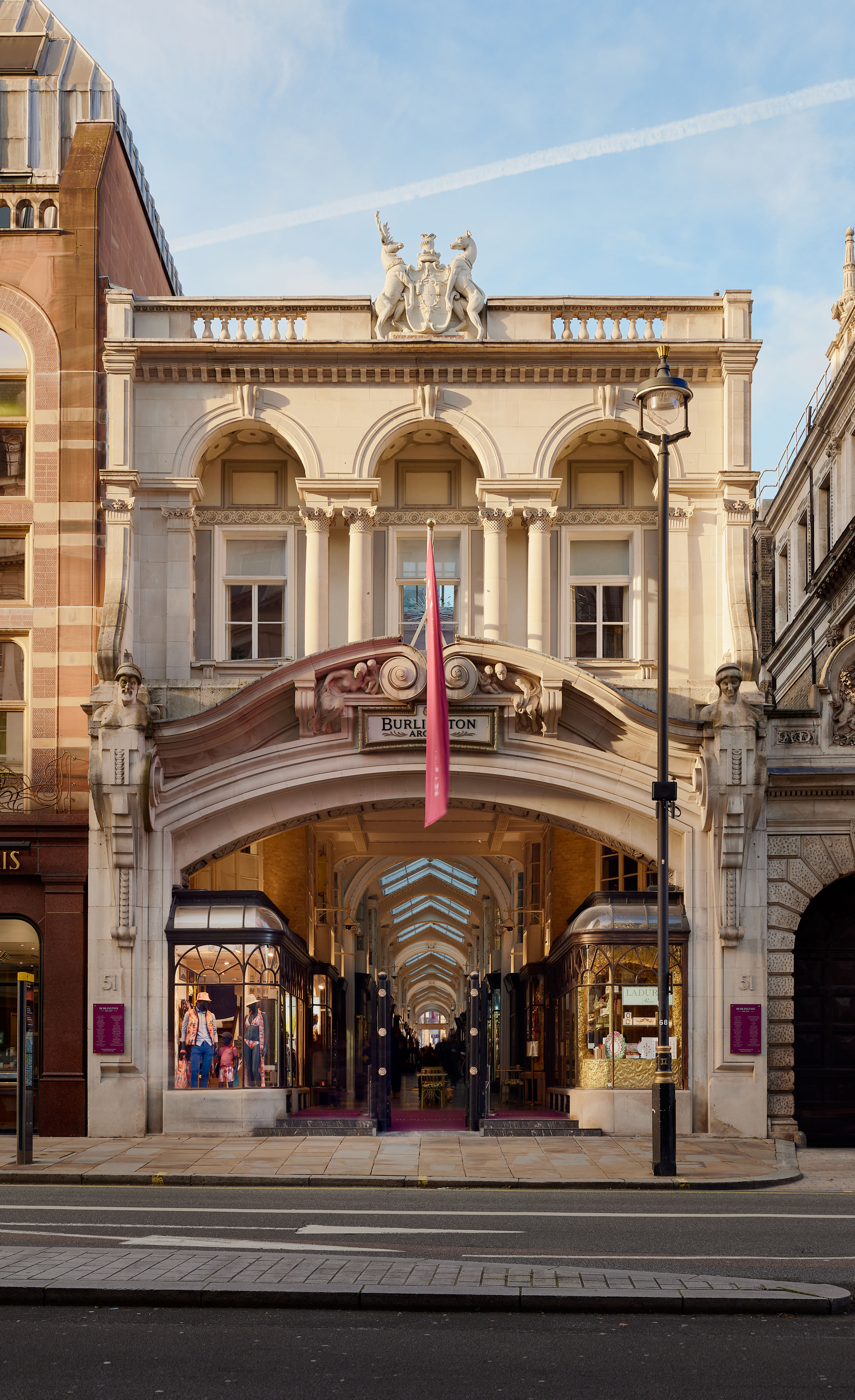
Piccadilly entrance to Burlington Arcade in 2024

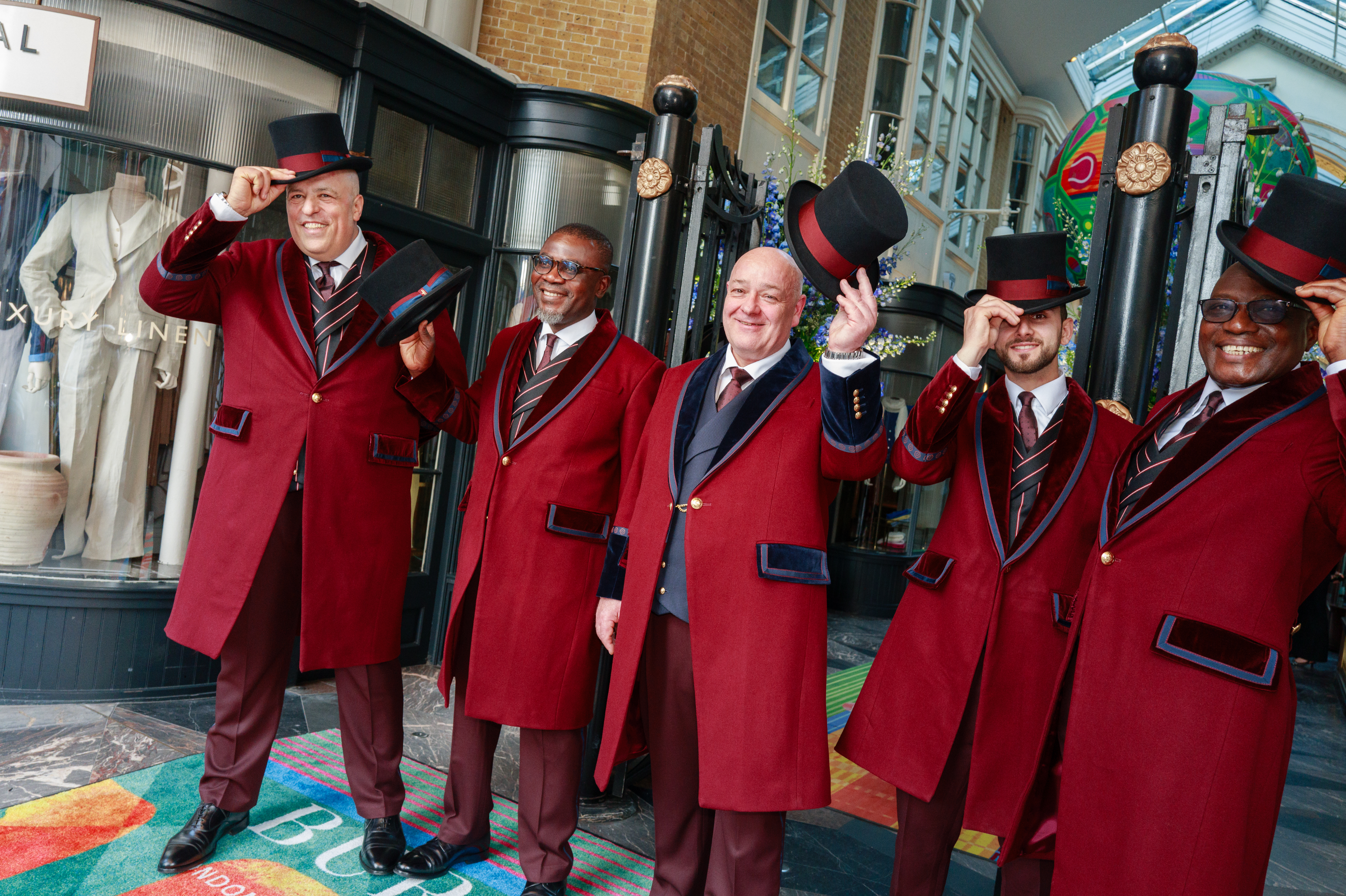
Beadles in the arcade, 2024

Burlington Arcade opened on 20 March 1819. From the outset, it positioned itself as an elegant and exclusive upmarket shopping venue, with shops offering luxury goods. It was one of London's earliest covered shopping arcades and one of several such arcades constructed in Western Europe in the early 19th century. (Other examples of grand shopping arcades include Covered passages of Paris, Palais Royal in Paris (opened in 1784); Passage de Feydeau in Paris (opened in 1791), Galeries Royales Saint-Hubert in Brussels and The Passage in St. Petersburg, the Galleria Umberto I in Naples, and the Galleria Vittorio Emanuele II in Milan (1878).)

The original arcade consisted of a single straight top-lit walkway lined with 72 small two-storey units. Some units have been combined, reducing the number of shops to around 40. The Piccadilly façade, with sculptures carved by Benjamin Clemens, a professor of sculpture at the Royal College of Art, was added in 1911.

The arcade is patrolled by beadles in traditional uniforms, including top hats and frock coats. The original beadles were all former members of Lord George Cavendish's regiment, the 10th Royal Hussars. The arcade maintains Regency decorum by banning singing, humming, hurrying, and "behaving boisterously." Whistling is also banned in Burlington Arcade due to its original use as a signal to pickpockets. Only three people have been exempted from the ban: Sir Paul McCartney, a 12 year old boy named Jayden who was granted the exemption after getting a good report at school, and Geert Chatrou, a three time world whistling champion.

The present tenants include a range of clothing, footwear, and accessory shops, art and antique dealers, and the jewellers and dealers in antique silver for which the Arcade is best known.

== Historical events ==
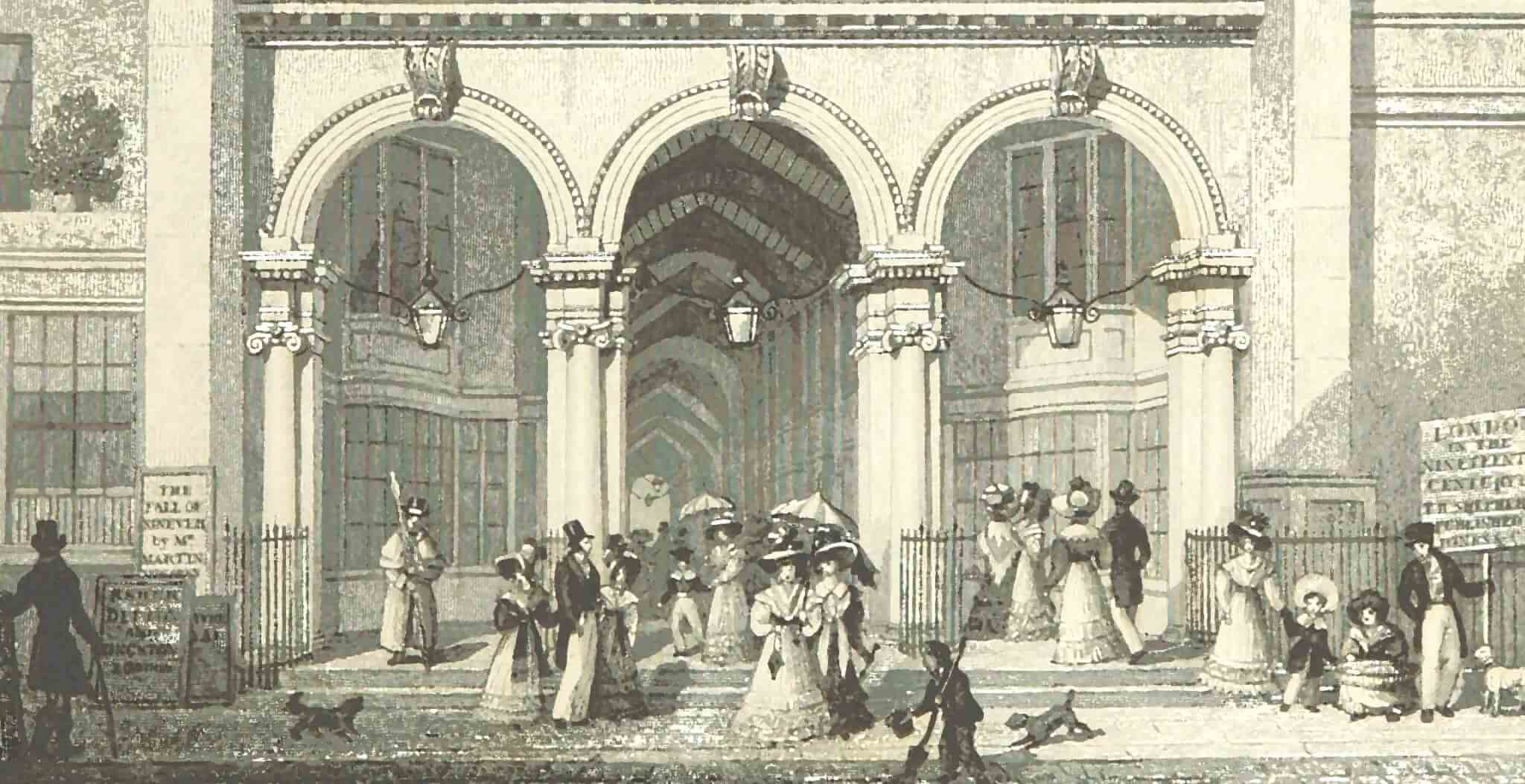
Piccadilly entrance to the Burlington Arcade in 1827–28

The arcade was almost destroyed by fire in 1836, when several shops were destroyed, in 1871, and in 1936, when the arcade was subject to looting.

Parts of the arcade were badly damaged in a bombing raid during the Second World War.

In 1964, a Jaguar Mark X charged down the arcade, scattering pedestrians, and six masked men leapt out, smashed the windows of the Goldsmiths and Silversmiths Association shop, and stole jewellery valued at £35,000. They were never caught. Gates were installed to prevent this from happening again.

In 2010, Thor Equities and Meyer Bergman acquired the property for £104 million. The owners hired architect Michael Blair to restore the arcade.

In May 2018, the property was sold to David and Simon Reuben for £300 million.

== See also ==
- Burlington Bertie
- Royal Arcade, London
- Piccadilly Arcade
- Kensington Arcade
- Sicilian Avenue
- Woburn Walk
- Leadenhall Market
- Lowther Arcade
- Victoria Station Arcade
- Quadrant Arcade
