= Victoria Station Arcade =

Shopping arcade in London

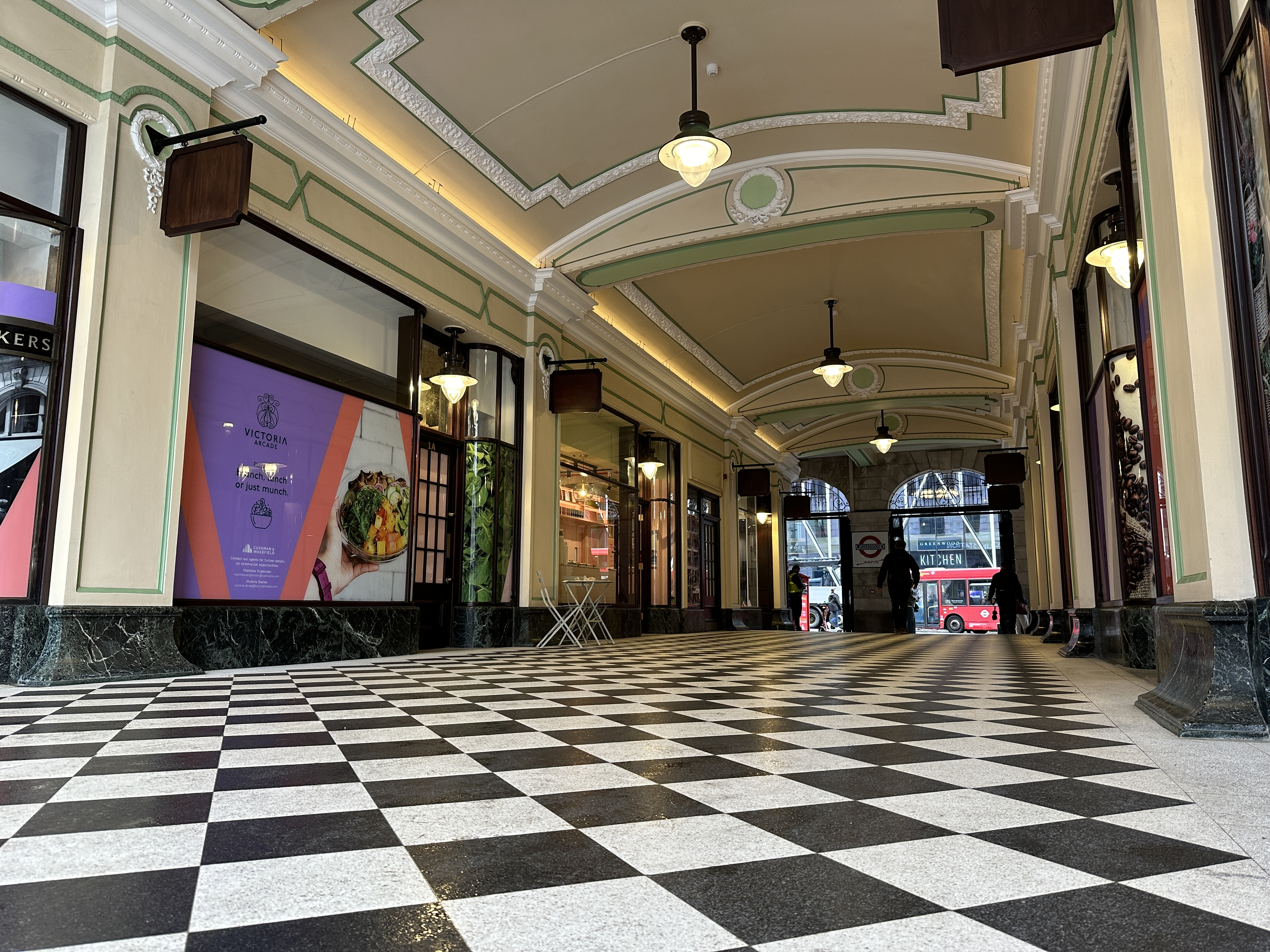
- Inside of Victoria Station Arcade in 2024, after restoration

General information
- Type: Commercial
- Architectural style: Edwardian
- Location: Victoria, London, England
- Coordinates: 51°29′47″N 0°08′38″W
- Completed: 1911

Listed Building – Grade II
- Official name: Victoria Station Arcade including Nos. 15 and 16 Terminus Place, and Nos. 9-14 Terminus Place (facade only)
- Designated: 30 September 2014
- Reference no.: 1420427

Victoria Station Arcade is a Grade II listed shopping arcade in Victoria, London with connections to Victoria tube station. It was designated in 2014 as an example of Edwardian retail design of architectural interest.

== History ==
The arcade was built and decorated in Edwardian Baroque style in 1911 as part of the rebuilding of the Metropolitan District Railway (now the District Railway). It was designed by George Sherrin, and after his death Harry Wharton Ford, under the ownership of Charles Tyson Yerkes. It was built alongside other stations along the District Railway which host shopping arcades such as Liverpool Street, South Kensington and Kensington High Street. After completion, the arcade was surmounted by Victoria Station House.

The arcade fell into disrepair in the 1970s following neglect. In 2020 restoration work was carried out on the arcade by Places for London as part of a plan by TfL to invest in retail infrastructure across the city.

== See also ==
- Kensington Arcade
- Burlington Arcade
- Piccadilly Arcade
- Quadrant Arcade
- Lowther Arcade
- Great Victorian Way
