= Charbonnel et Walker =

British chocolatier

Charbonnel et Walker Ltd
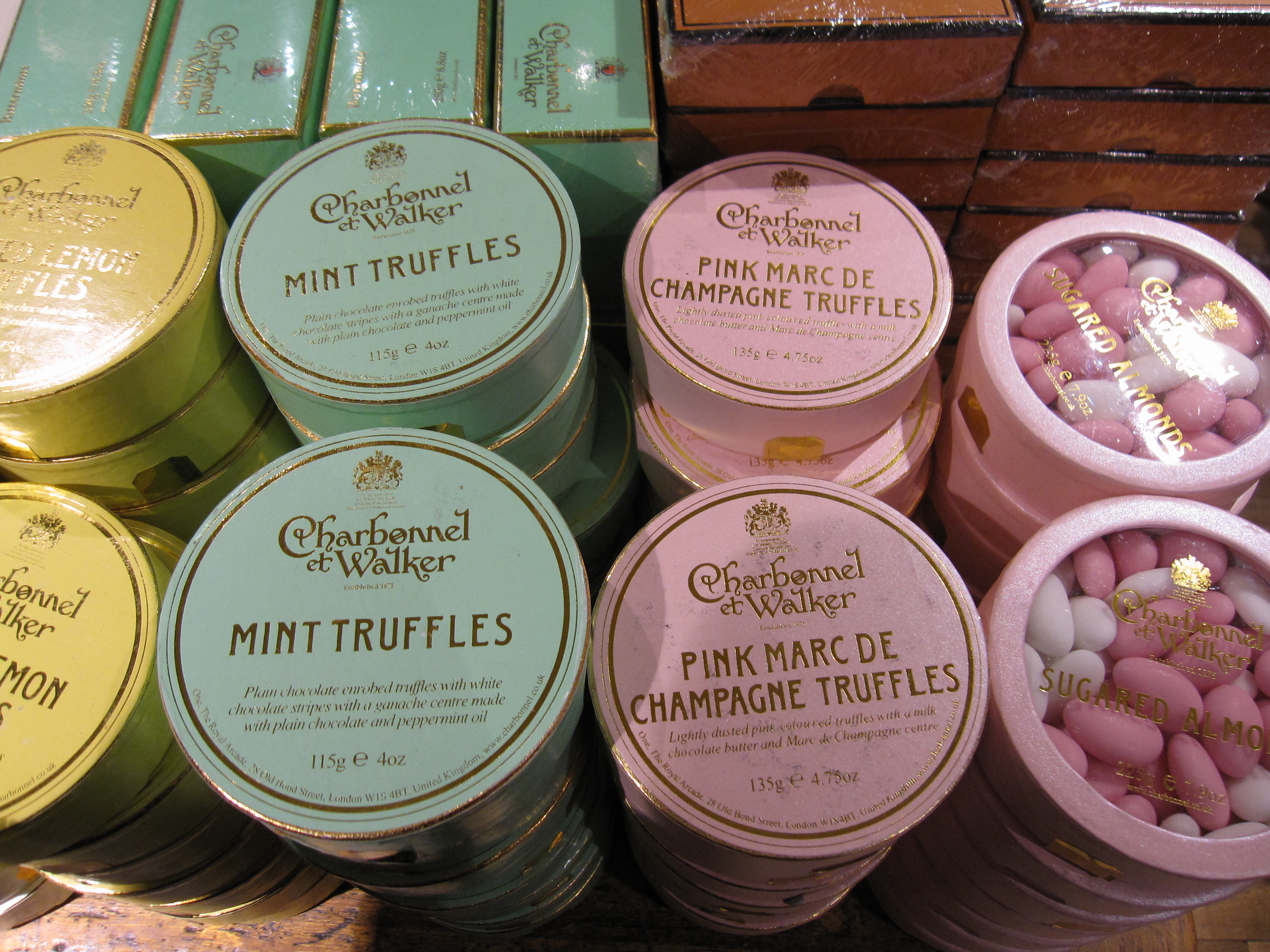
- Industry: Confectionery
- Founded: 1875; 151 years ago in London, United Kingdom
- Headquarters: London, United Kingdom
- Products: Chocolate
- Website: Charbonnel et Walker

Charbonnel et Walker Chocolatier is a British firm of chocolate makers based in Bond Street, London.

== History ==
Encouraged by Albert, Prince of Wales, later King Edward VII, in 1875 Virginie Eugenie Lévy, née Charbonnel, of Maison Boissier chocolate house in Paris, and Minnie Walker began a partnership in London as "Parisian Confectioners and Bon-Bon Manufacturers". The partnership of Charbonnel and [sic] Walker was dissolved on 16 April 1878 and Walker carried on alone until her death on 8 June 1883. The notice of death published in the London Gazette referred to "Mary Ann Alphandery also known as Minnie Walker". The company of Charbonnel and Walker Limited went into liquidation in June 1894. The connection with the royal family continues, as Charbonnel et Walker held a Royal Warrant as Chocolate Manufacturers to the Queen Elizabeth II.

Charbonnel et Walker is based in the Royal Arcade in Bond Street, not far from the original premises, and manufactured its chocolates at its factory in Tunbridge Wells, Kent, until 2018 when it relocated their production to Poundbury, Dorset.

The company claims a number of notable figures from history to have been customers, such as Noël Coward (who is said to have requested a fortnightly delivery box of their finest selections to his home), Wallis Simpson, John Gielgud, Alec Guinness, Lauren Bacall, Diana, Princess of Wales and Princess Margaret. Prince Francis of Teck, the younger brother of the British Queen Mary, bequeathed the Teck Emeralds to his mistress "after courting her with Charbonnel et Walker chocolates."

== Confectioneries ==
Charbonnel et Walker offers a wide variety of chocolates, as well as sugar confections like crystalized ginger and glazed brazil nuts. A speciality is the Marc de Champagne Chocolate Truffles: these are chocolate truffles with chocolate butter infused with Marc de Champagne.

The company also produces a themed "James Bond – 007" range, inspired by the James Bond film franchise, including 007 Dry Martini Truffles. Their hot drinking chocolate was created by Charbonnel in 1875; it is available in Original and Sea Salt Caramel flavours.

== Branches ==
As of 2022, there are four Charbonnel et Walker shops, as well as two outlets in department stores:

- Old Bond Street, London
- Canary Wharf, London
- Leeds, West Yorkshire
- Broadgate Circle, London
- Harrods – Chocolate Room (Ground Floor), London
- Selfridges – Chocolate Room (Lower Ground Floor), London
