= Benson & Clegg =

Bespoke tailors and gentlemen's outfitters in London

- Type: Bespoke Tailors
- Industry: Retailer
- Founded: London, England (1937)
- Founder: Harry Benson & Thomas Clegg
- Headquarters: London, United Kingdom
- Owner: Mark Gordon
- Website: bensonandclegg.com

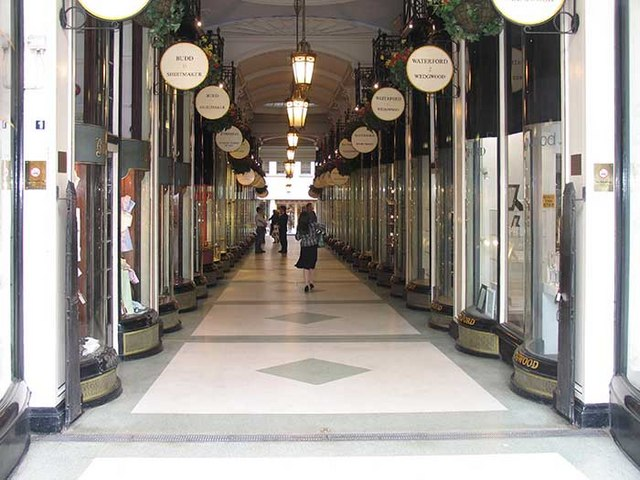
Picaddilly Arcade, 2008

Benson & Clegg is a bespoke tailor and gentlemen's outfitters located at 9 Piccadilly Arcade, Jermyn Street in London.

Benson & Clegg was founded by Harry Benson and Thomas Clegg, who both worked for Hawes & Curtis, at 34 Bury Street, London SW1, their original premises. In 1976, they moved to 9 Piccadilly Arcade, off Jermyn Street.

They have had a Royal Warrant from King George VI since 1944, and in 1992 were granted a further warrant from Prince Charles.

The philosophy of the founders was that bespoke tailoring should be accessible to all with a welcoming and relaxed approach to building long standing relationships with their clients, an ethos that the company is known for today. Harry Benson and Thomas Clegg created their unique tailoring profile which is today mirrored in the house style. A smooth, natural shoulder and profiled waist.

The company is one of only sixteen bespoke tailors to be members of the elite Savile Row Bespoke Association, an organisation convened to establish a method of identifying garments specifically made by Savile Row tailors who meet the association's required specifications.

As of 2018, the firm is owned by Mark Gordon.

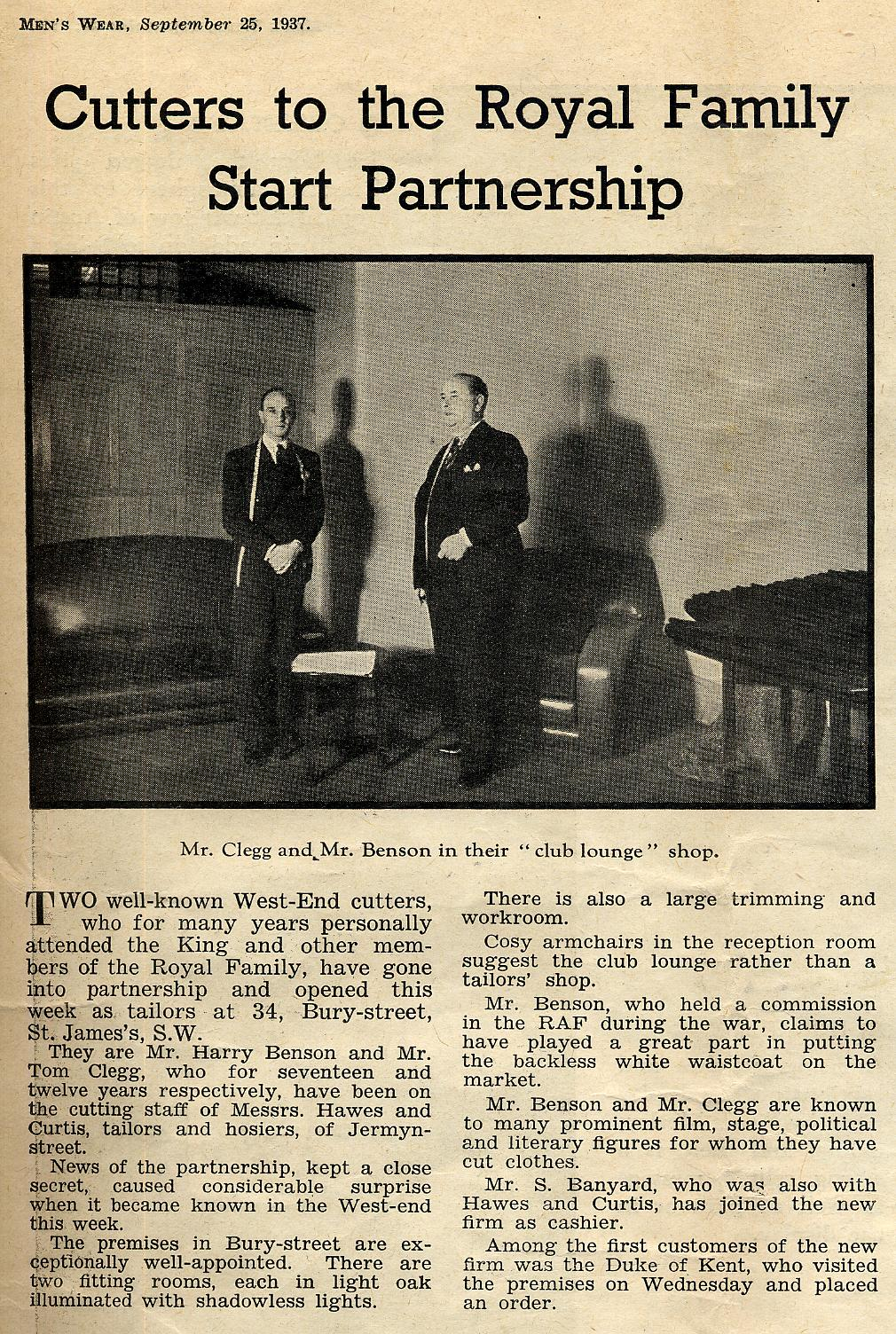
Founding article from 1937

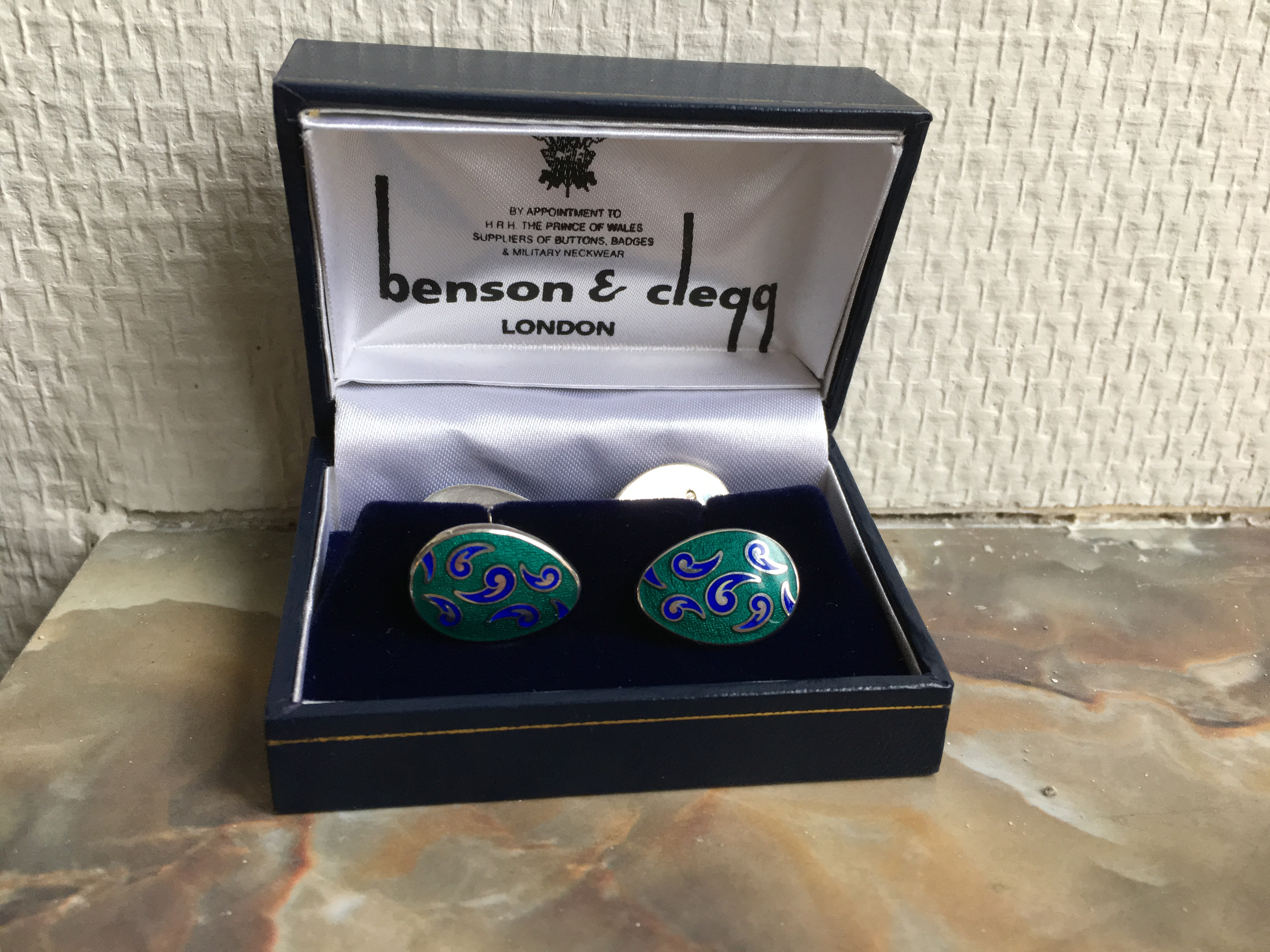
Cufflinks from the British Royal Warrant holder Benson and Clegg
