= Princes Arcade =

Arcade of shops in London, England

Coordinates: 51.508417°N 0.137603°W

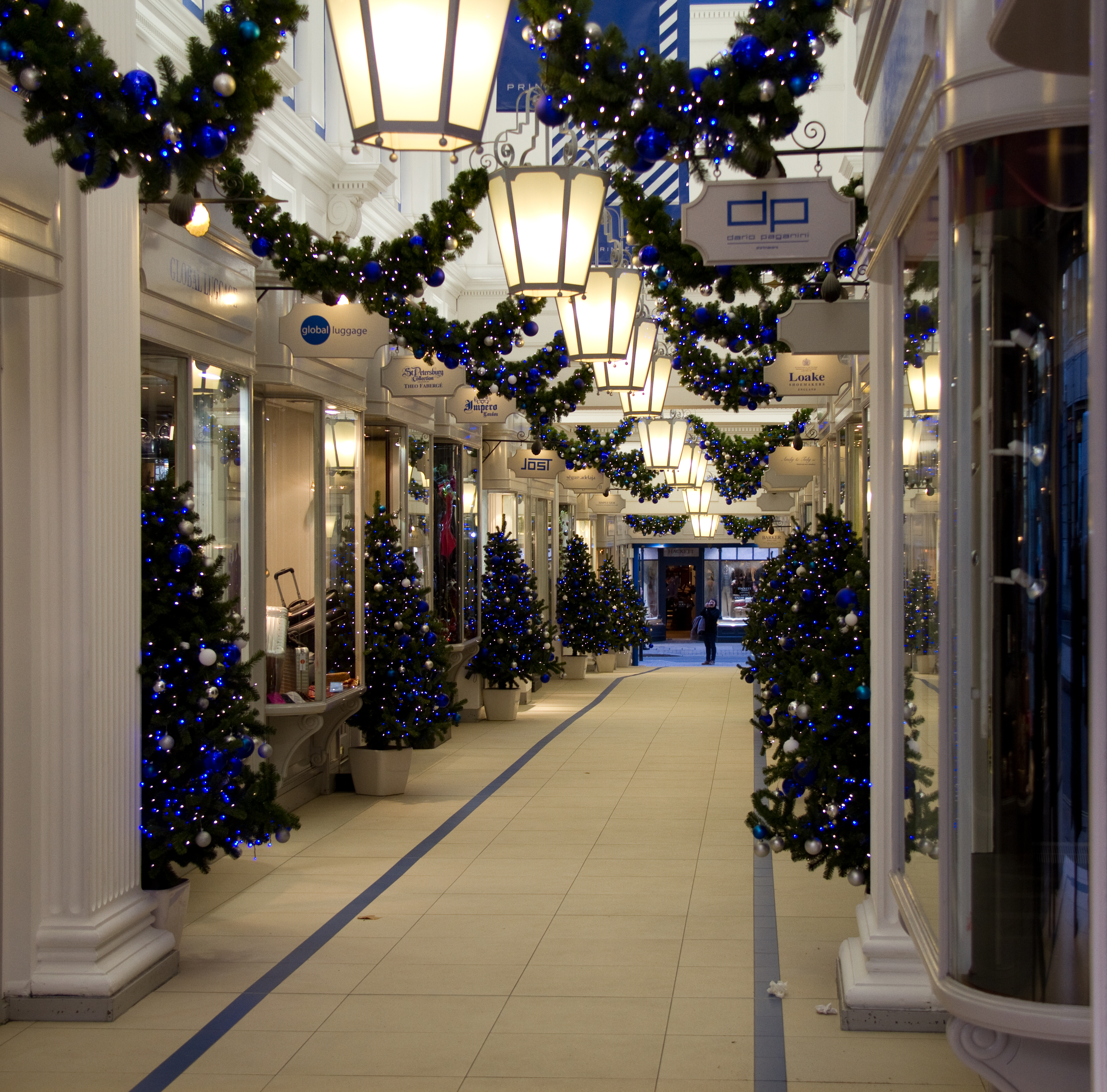
The arcade in Christmas 2011

Princes Arcade is an arcade of shops running between Piccadilly and Jermyn Street in Westminster. It is home to a number of small menswear shops and boutiques.

The arcade is located on the site of the former Princes Hotel, designed by Edward Robert Robson for the Royal Institute of Painters in Water Colours and opened in April 1883. A westward extension of the hotel was built between 1911 and 1913, which is now Nos. 39-40 Jermyn Street. The arcade was constructed between 1929 and 1933, linking the two streets. The hotel was subsequently converted into offices.

The arcade was refurbished by the Crown Estate in 2018 as "a space for innovative retail brands".

== See also ==
- Piccadilly Arcade - nearby arcade also running from Piccadilly to Jermyn Street
- Burlington Arcade - arcade on the opposite side of Piccadilly
