= Samuel Ware =

British architect (1781–1860)

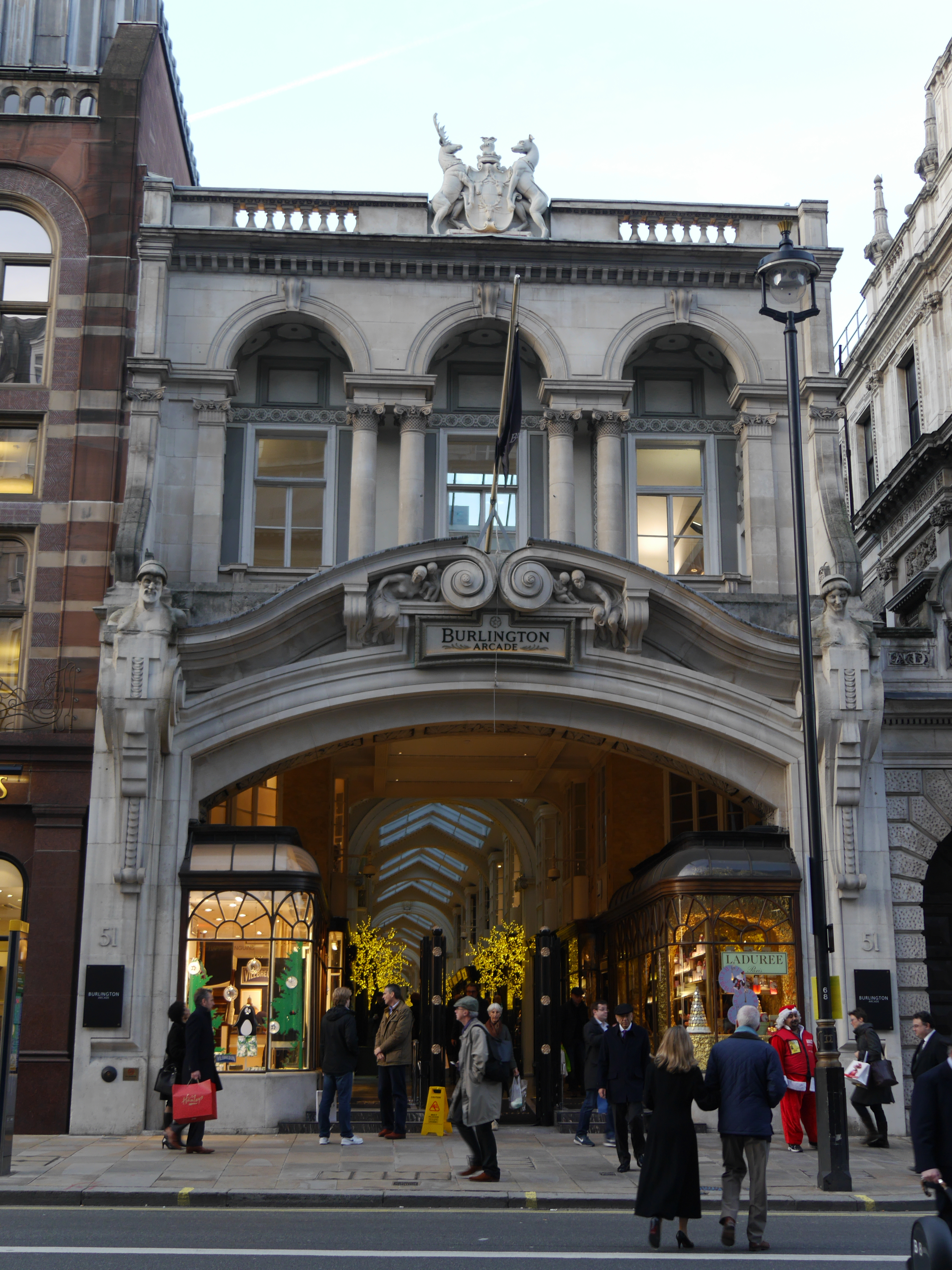
Burlington Arcade, London, 2015

Samuel Ware (1781–1860) was a British architect, who worked for the sixth Duke of Devonshire on his properties in England and Ireland.

He is best known for having designed London's Burlington Arcade along the west side of Burlington House in Piccadilly for George Cavendish, 1st Earl of Burlington.
