= Woburn Walk =

Pedestrian street in Bloomsbury, London

Coordinates: 51.52716°N 0.1289°W

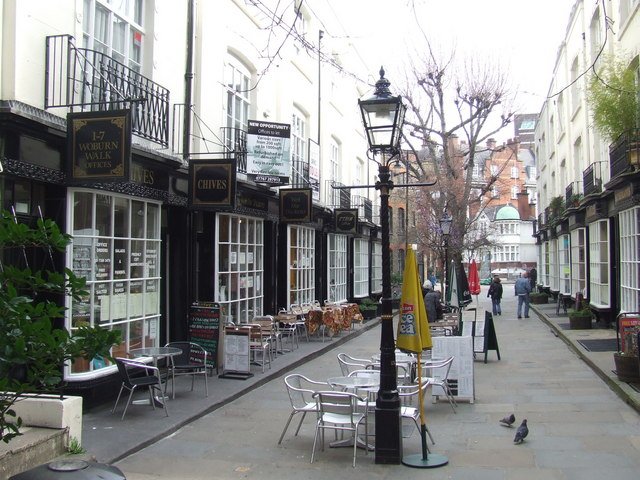
Woburn Walk

Woburn Walk is a pedestrian street in Bloomsbury, London, that was designed by architect Thomas Cubitt in 1822, and it is one of the first examples of a pedestrian shopping street in the Regency era. Its name comes from Woburn Abbey, the main country seat of the Dukes of Bedford, who developed much of Bloomsbury.

The street is well-preserved, including the black painted bow-fronted shops windows. Several of the buildings are Grade II* listed (No. 1-9 and 9a, Woburn Walk). The walk shares the same building design with the adjacent Duke's Road, which however was built open to traffic.

As of today a number of shops, restaurants and a café are located on both sides of the walk.

== Notable residents ==
From 1895 to 1919, the Irish poet, dramatist and Nobel Prize winner W. B. Yeats lived at what is today 5 Woburn Walk.

From 1905 to 1906, the novelist Dorothy Richardson lived in Woburn Walk, in the building number 6, opposite where Yeats stayed. A blue plaque has been erected there in May 2015.

== Use of Woburn Walk on Screen ==
In series 3 of Bridgerton (2024) Woburn Walk appears in episodes 3 and 4. According to Tony Hood, the locations leader who has worked on all three seasons of Bridgerton: 'We don't do anything small in Bridgerton. So we changed the whole street. We occupied all 16 shop fronts on the whole walkway'.

== See also ==
- Alley
- Pedestrian zone
- Shopping mall
- Sicilian Avenue
- Woburn Square
- Woburn Place
