= Royal Arcade, London =

Shopping arcade in London, England

Coordinates: 51.5090°N 0.1415°W

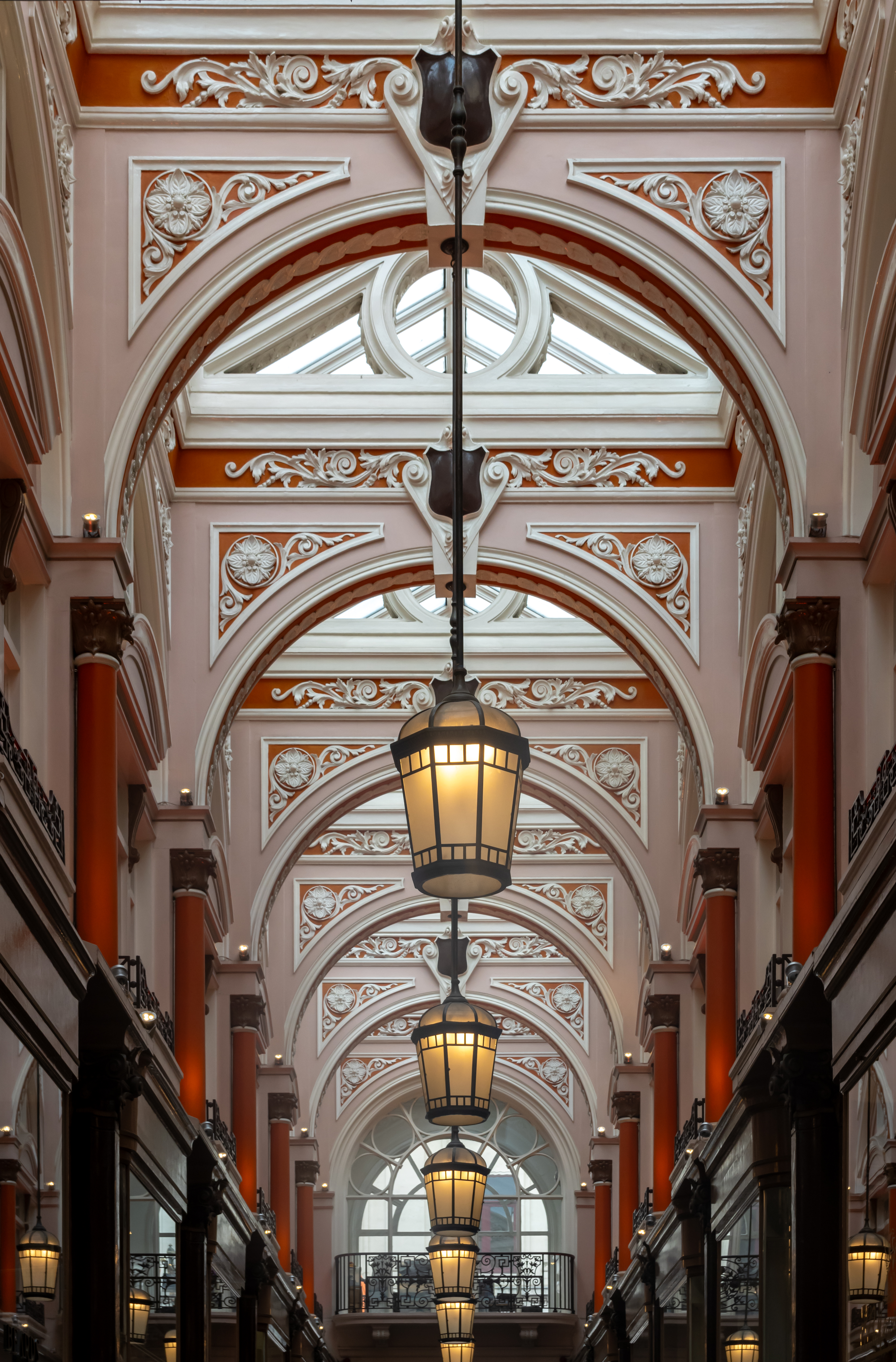
Interior

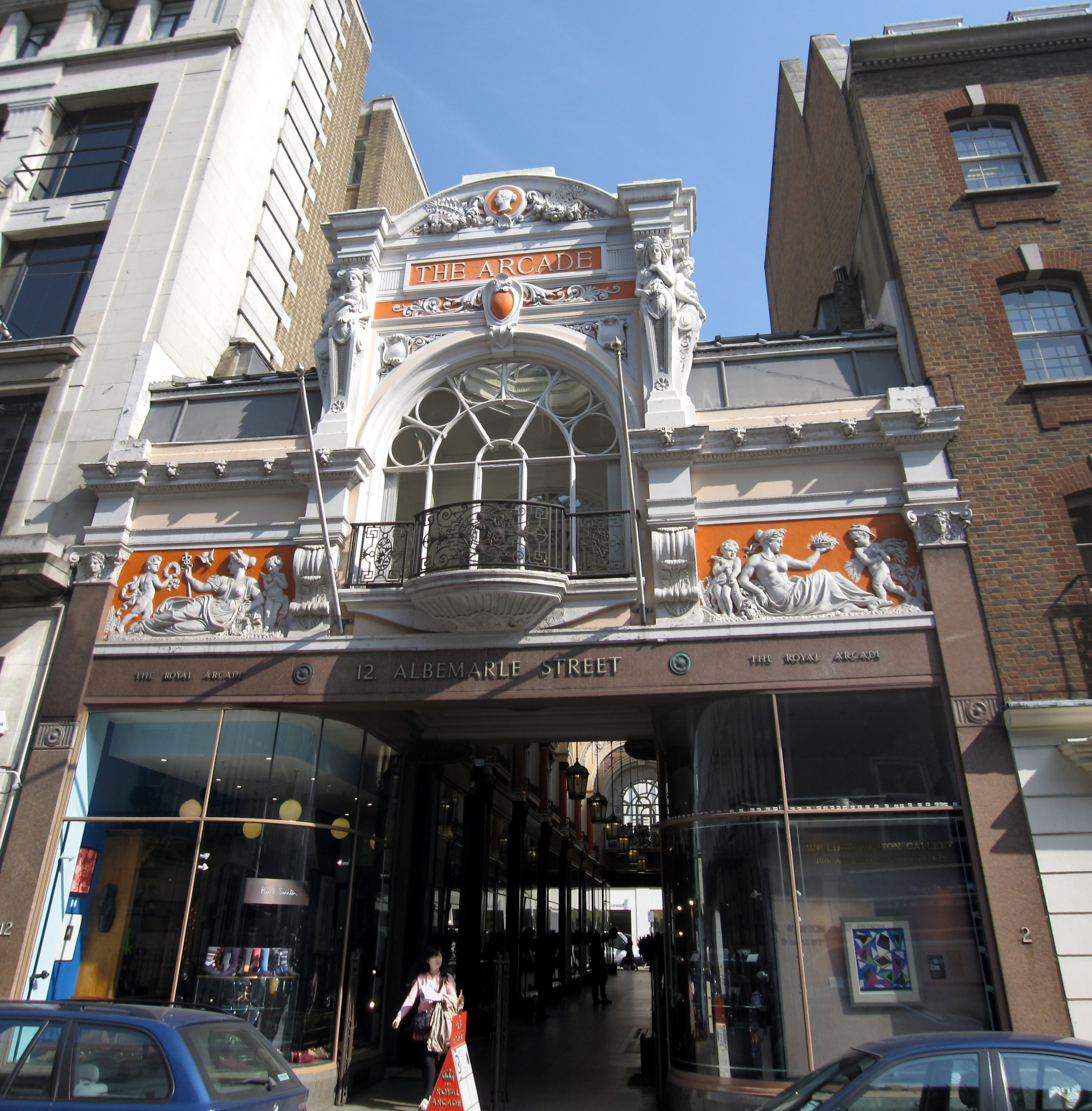
Entrance at Albemarle Street

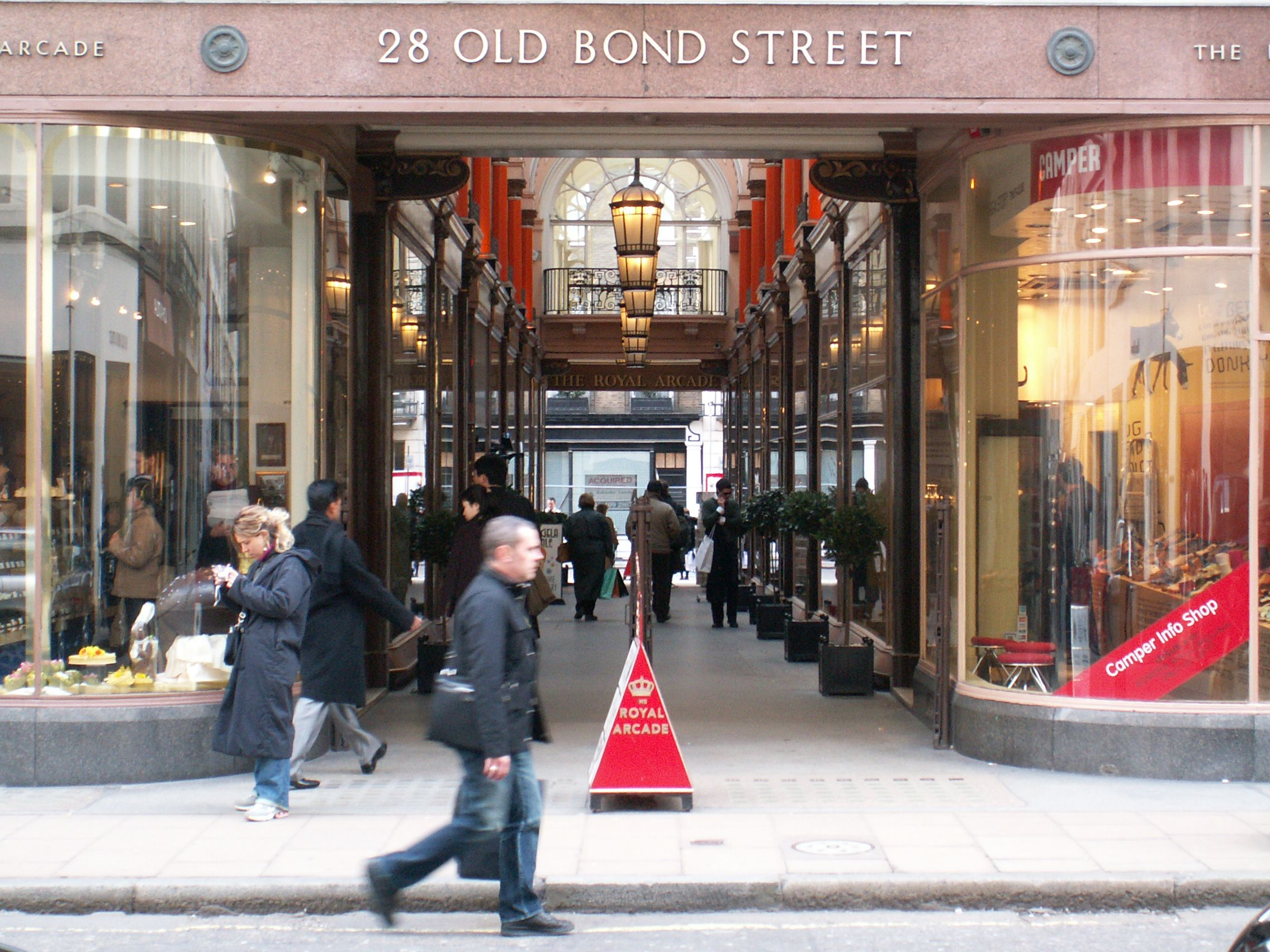
Entrance at Old Bond Street

The Royal Arcade, located in Mayfair, London, is a Victorian era shopping arcade that runs from 12 Albemarle Street to 28 Old Bond Street. Completed in 1880, it was designed by architects Archer & Green and is Grade II listed.

== History ==
Development of an arcade in the area was originally proposed in 1864 as a longer link between Old Bond Street and Regent Street, but was rejected due to the scale of proposed demolition and restriction of access to existing properties. A subsequent redesigned proposal was submitted with its current layout, and the arcade as it appears today opening in 1880.

With its saddled glass roof and decorated stucco arches, curved glass shop fronts with Ionic columns, the arcade has changed little in the intervening 138 years and retains all its original features, making it a rare original Victorian arcade.

Originally called The Arcade, it acquired its royal prefix when shirtmaker H. W. Brettell was patronised by Queen Victoria in the early 1880s. William Hodgson Brettell opened his shirtmakers in The Arcade in 1880 (aged 24) and occupied number 12.

The Royal Arcade has been used as a location for TV and film, including The Parent Trap (1998), Miss Pettigrew Lives for a Day (2008), Balletboyz (2013) for Channel 4 and in 2016 Film Stars Don’t Die in Liverpool. Parts of Agatha Christie's Poirot episode The Theft of the Royal Ruby were also filmed there.

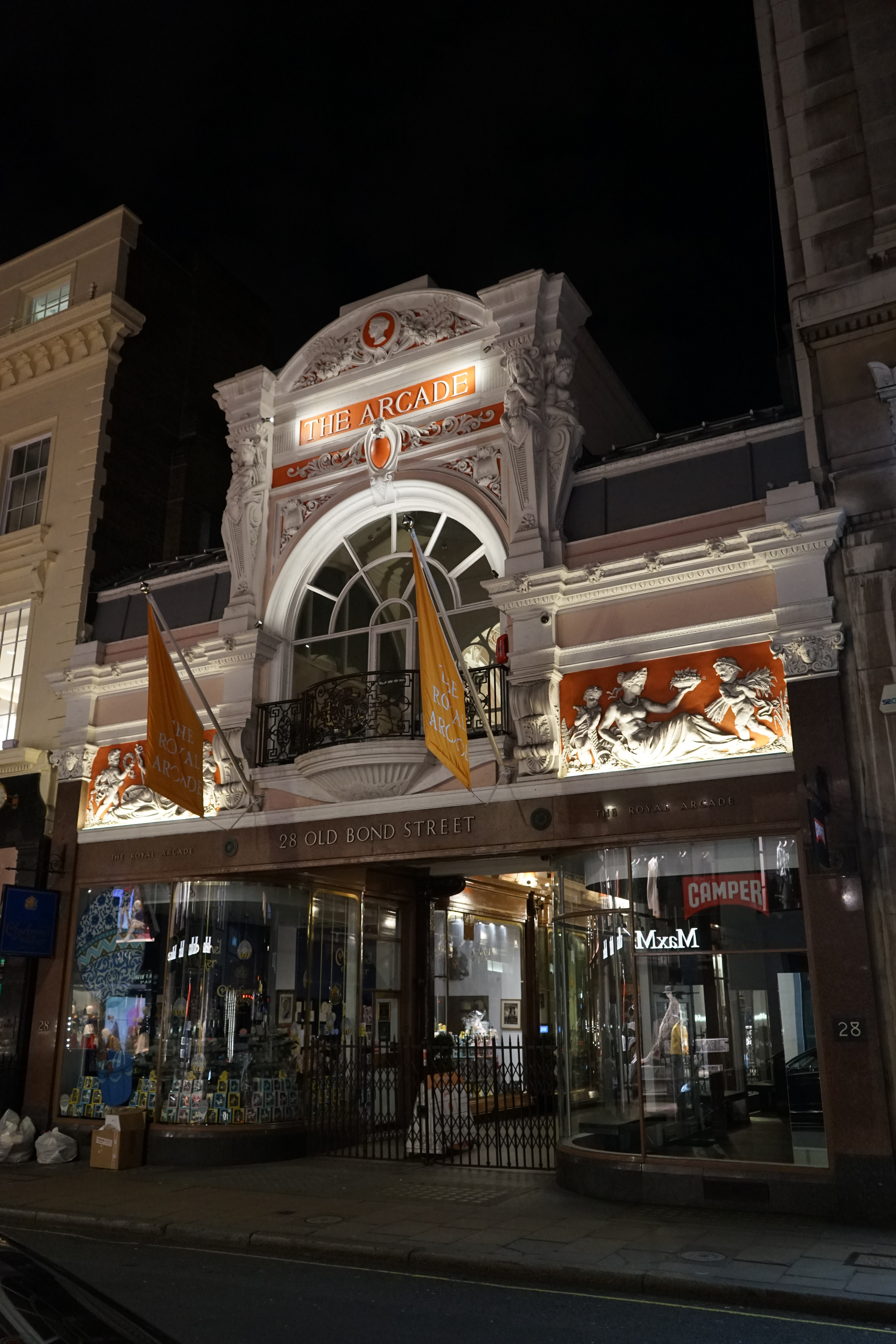
Royal Arcade during night

== Shops in 2025 ==
- Charbonnel et Walker, 1&2
- Simon Griffen Antiques, 3
- Watch Club, 4&5
- EB Meyrowitz Optician, 6
- Calleija Jewellery, 7
- Browns Jewellers, 8-11
- Mekhann, 12
- George Cleverley, 13
- Erskine, Hall & Coe, 15
- Ormonde Jayne, 16

== See also ==
Burlington Arcade – another nearby arcade in Mayfair
