= Piccadilly Arcade =

Shopping arcade in London

Coordinates: 51.5080°N 0.1392°W

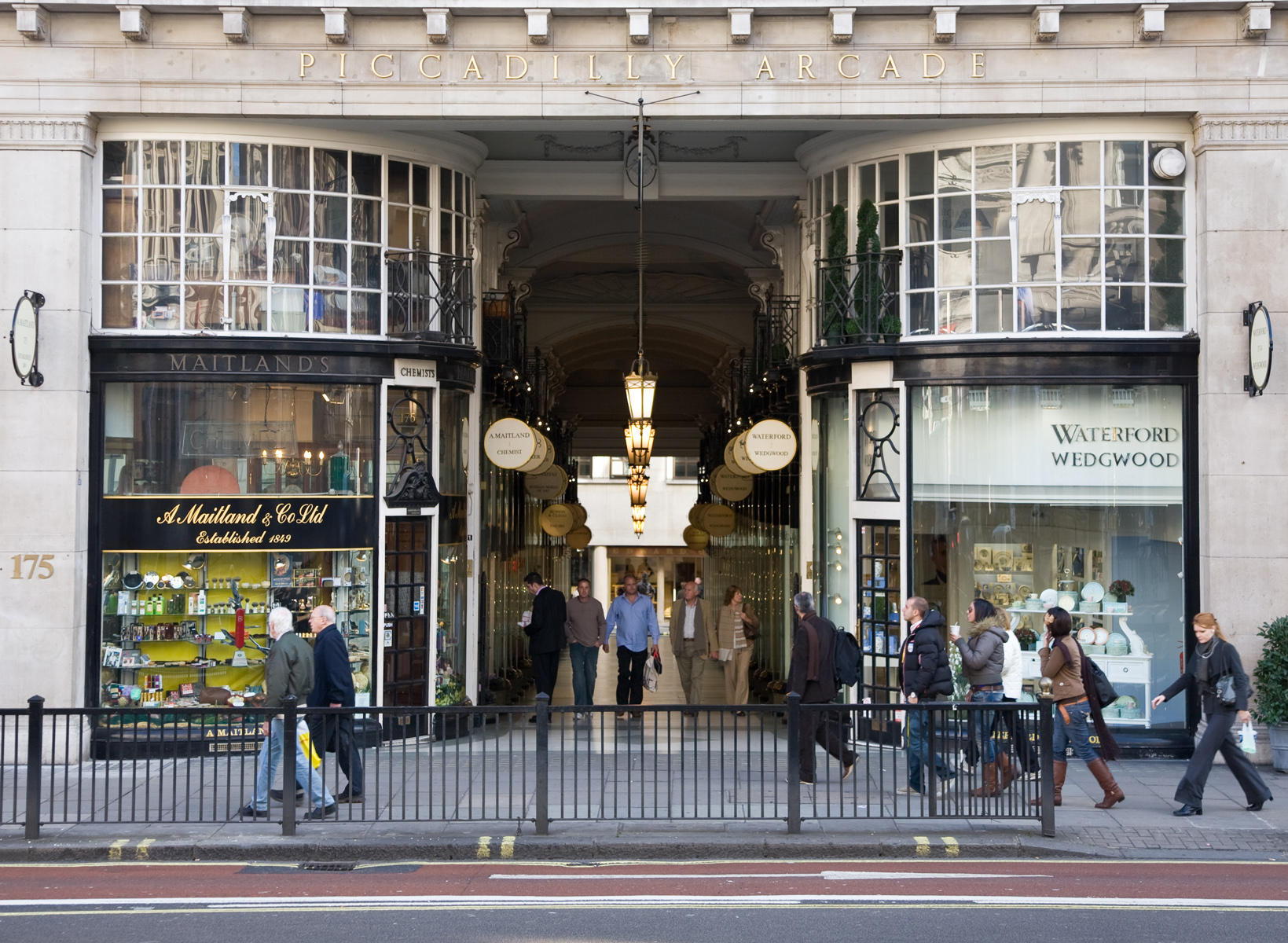
Piccadilly Arcade from the north side of Piccadilly

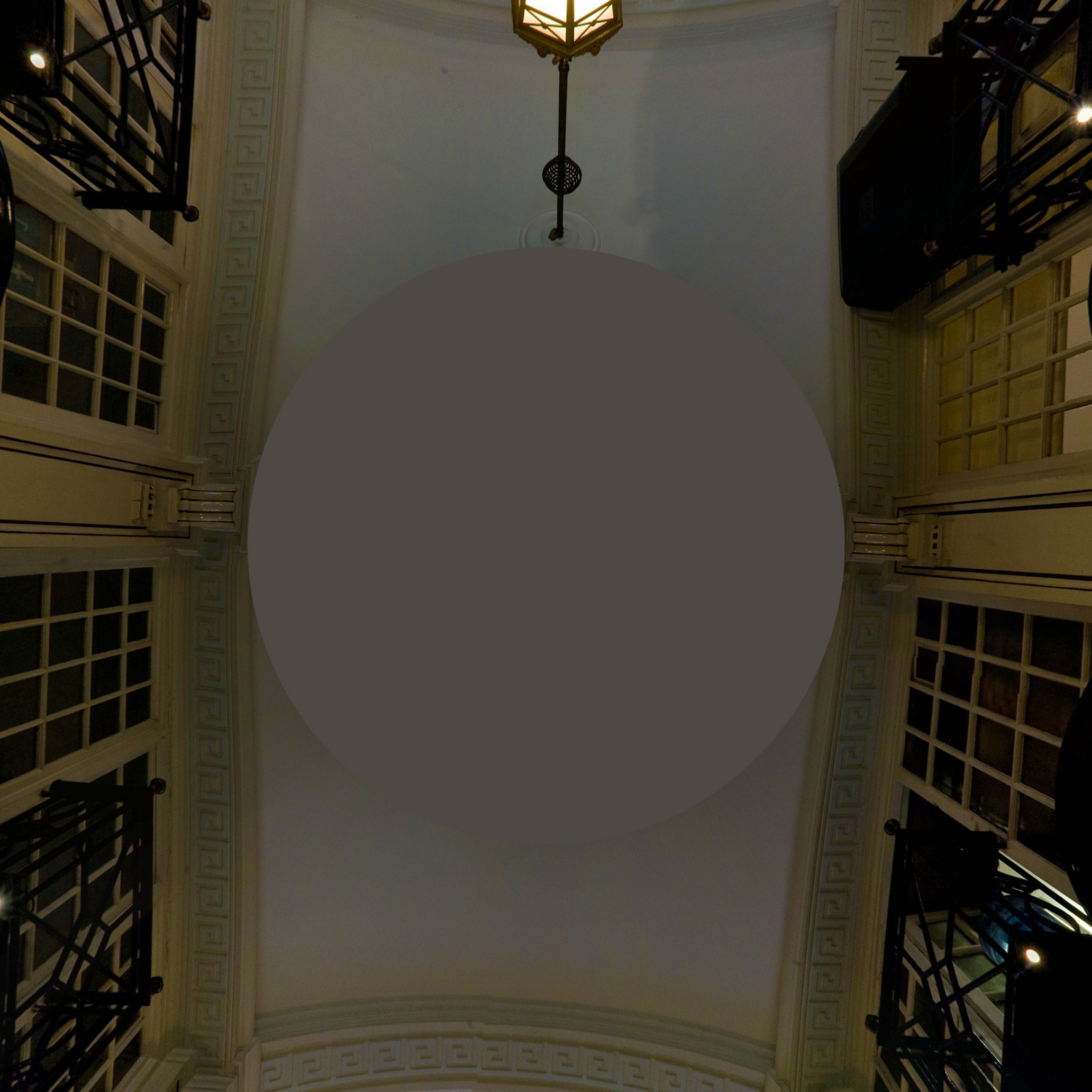
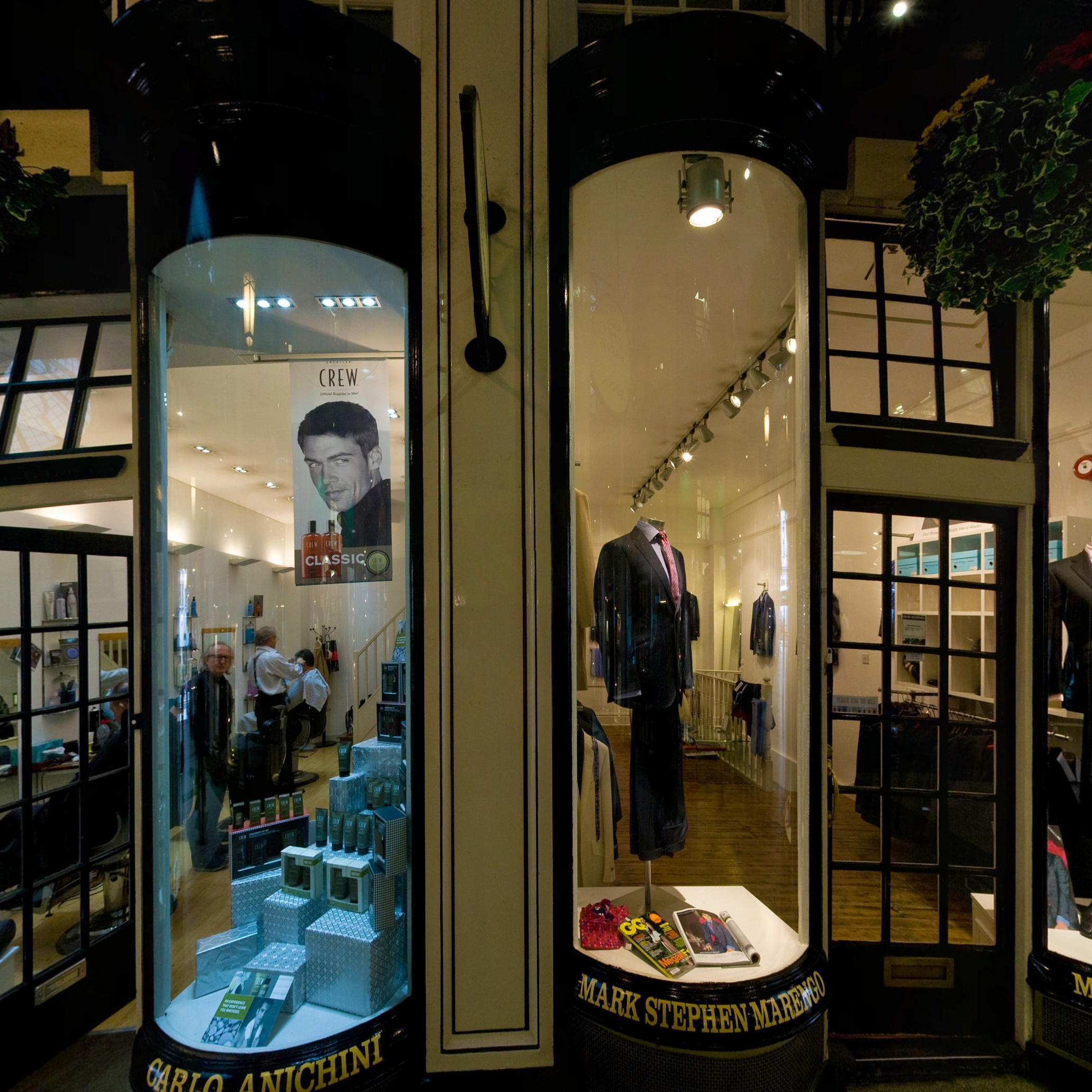
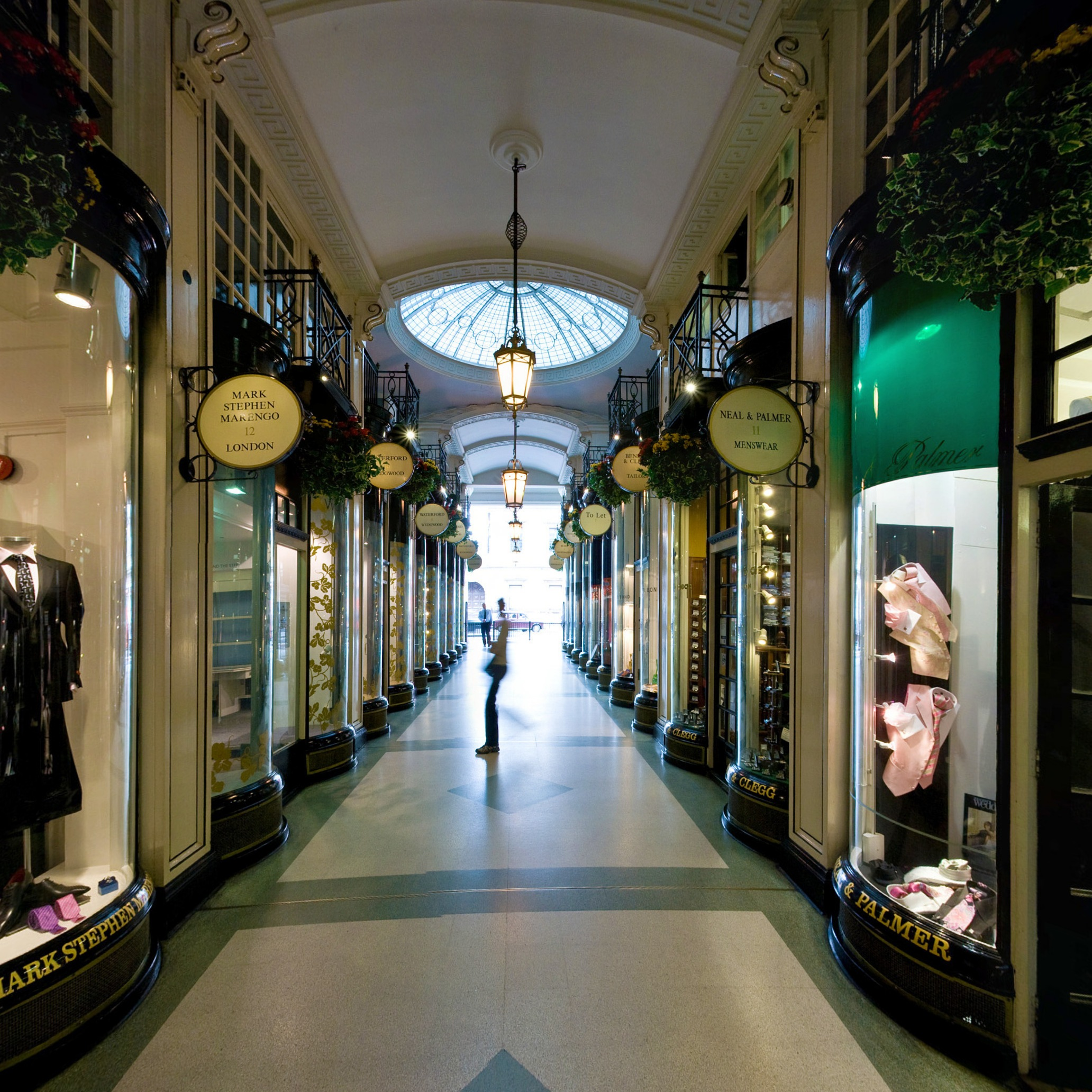
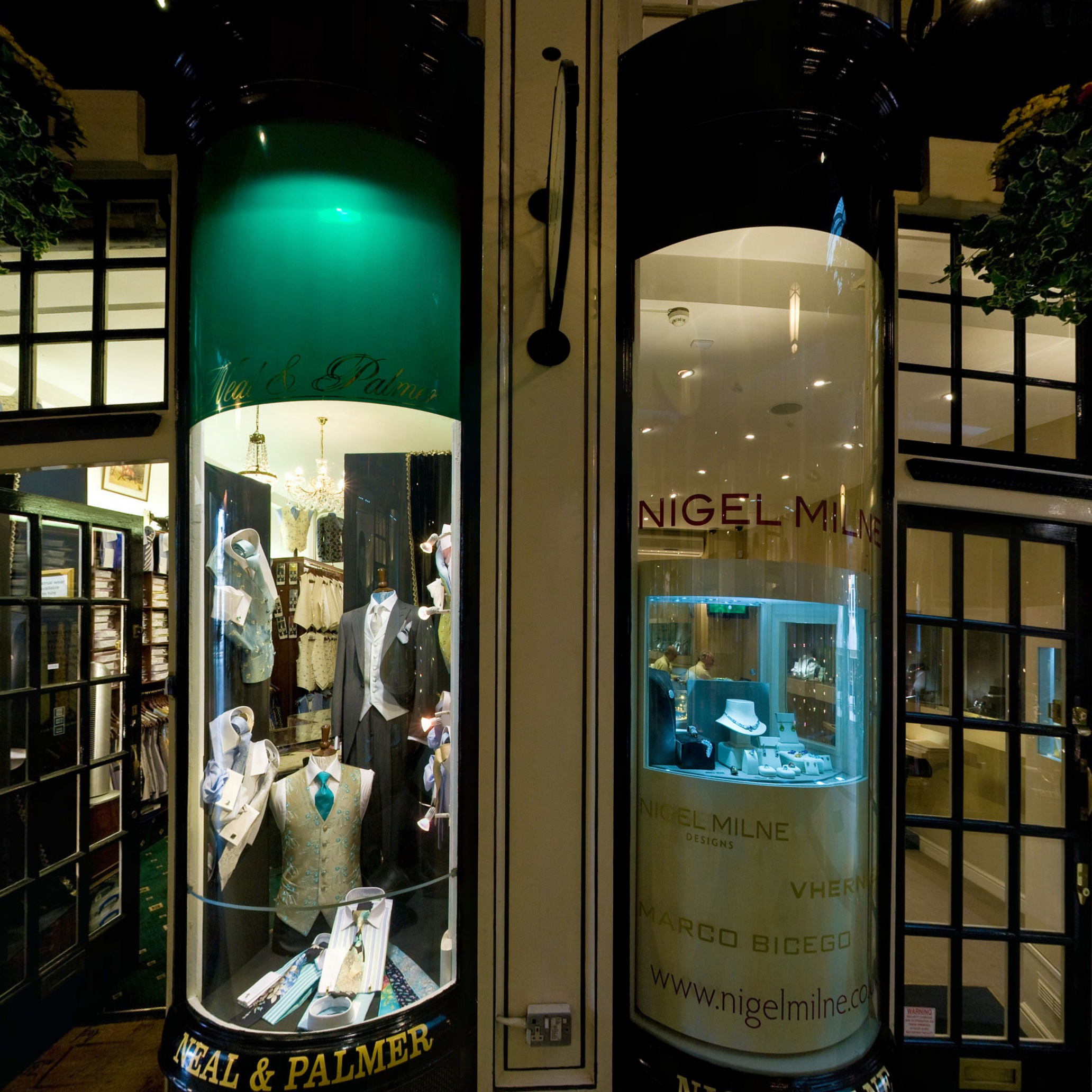
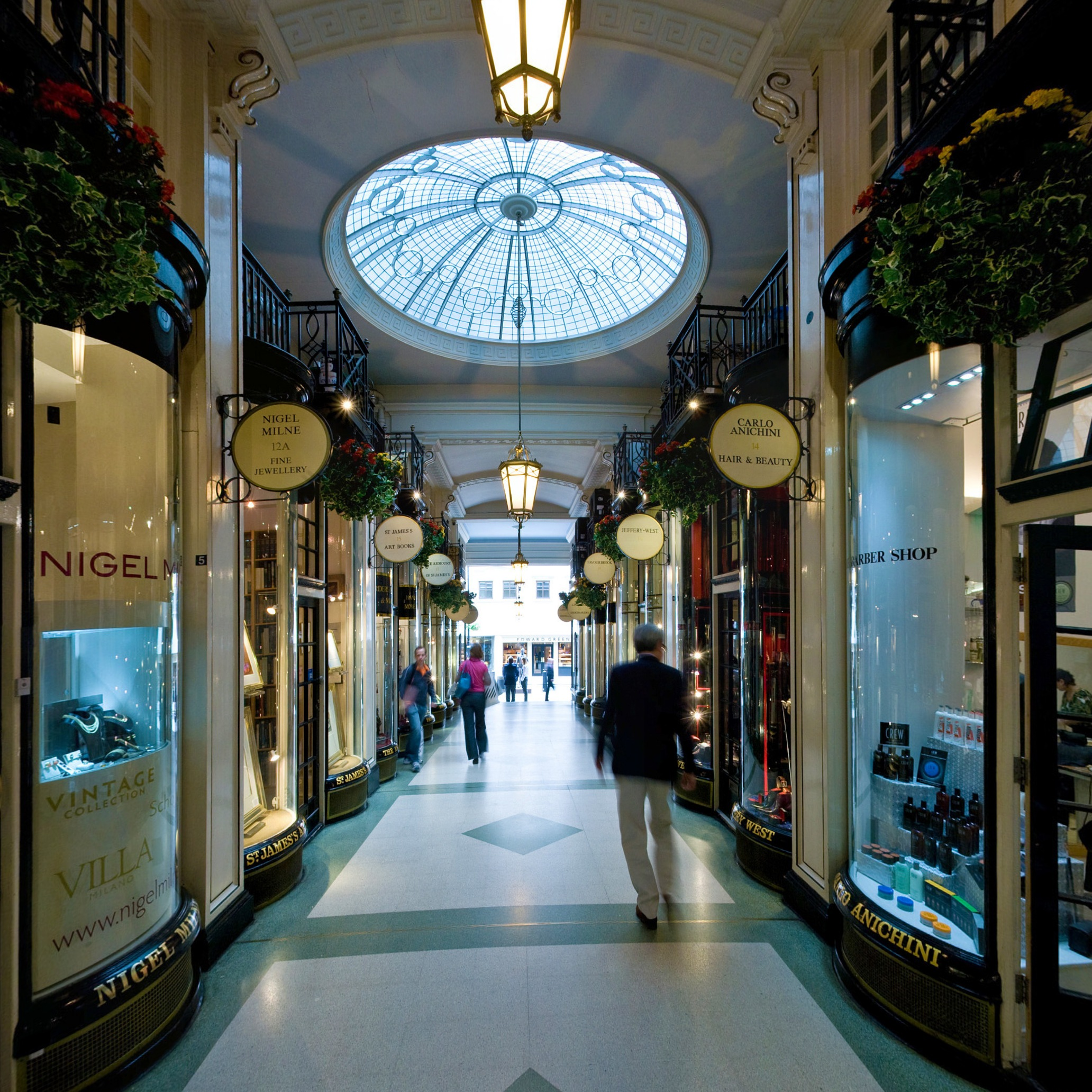
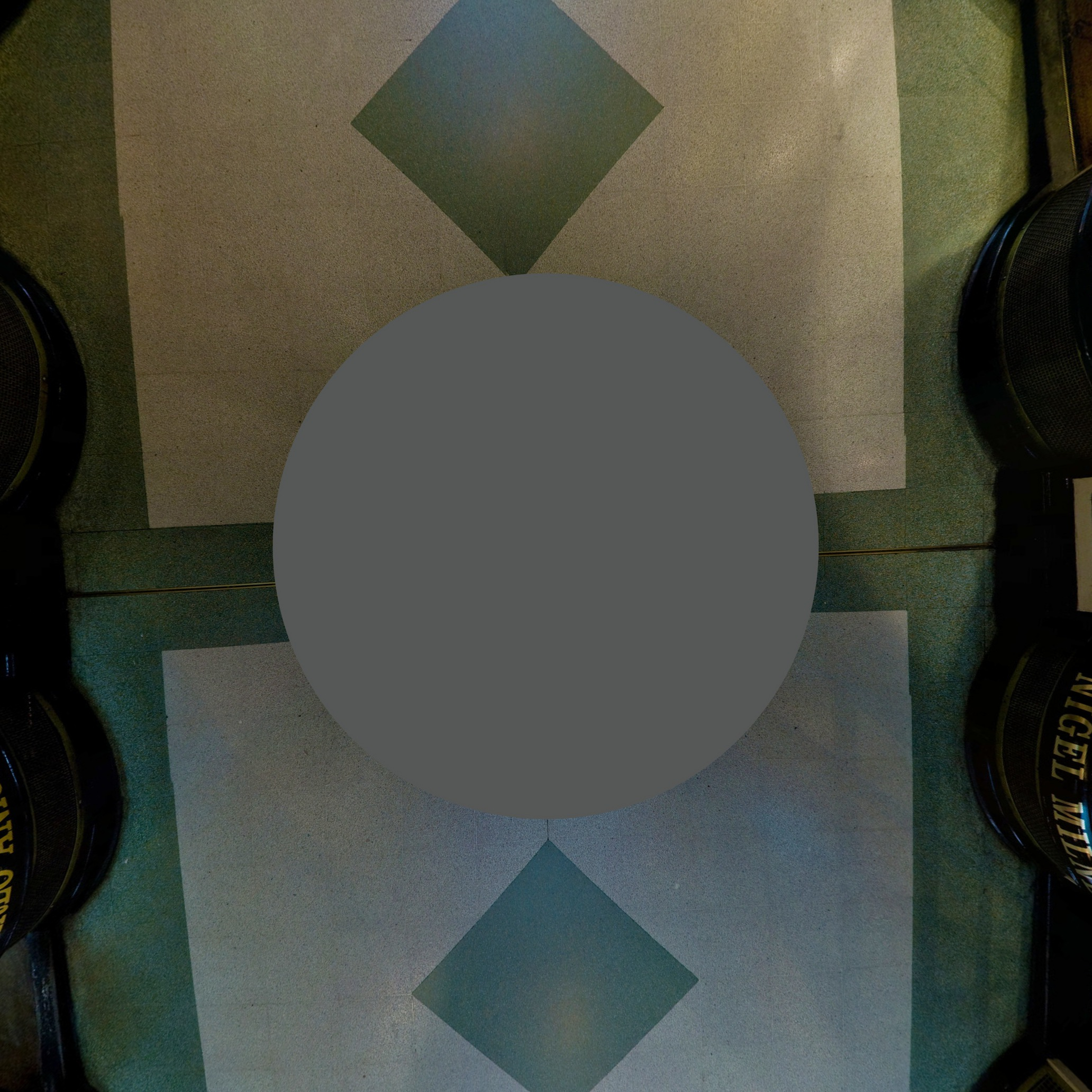
A 360 degree view from inside the arcade

Piccadilly Arcade runs between Piccadilly and Jermyn Street in the City of Westminster. It was opened in 1909, having been designed by Thrale Jell, and is a Grade II listed building.

The arcade is composed of twenty-eight shops on the ground floor. The first floor was originally offices, but converted to the Felix Hotel in 1915. The buildings were bombed in 1941 during World War II and not fully restored until 1957.

Among the shops in the arcade are the Royal Warrant holder Benson & Clegg, who moved here in 1976 from their previous location in Jermyn Street.

A bronze statue of Beau Brummell stands at the Jermyn Street end of the arcade, designed by Irena Sidiecka.

== See also ==
- Princes Arcade – nearby arcade also running from Piccadilly to Jermyn Street
- Burlington Arcade – arcade on the opposite side of Piccadilly
