= List of public art in Mayfair =

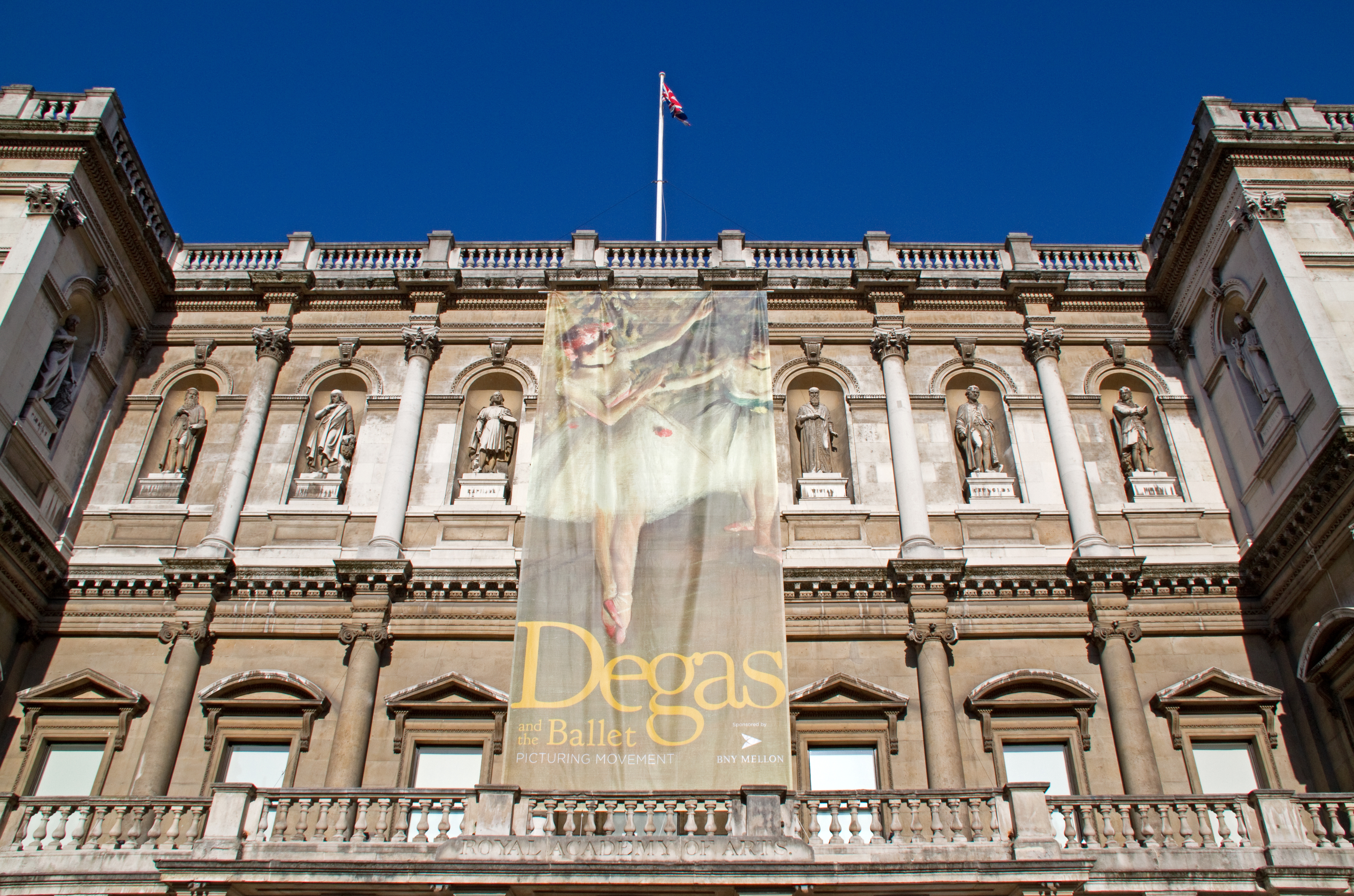
Architectural sculpture on the façade of Burlington House

This is a list of public art in Mayfair, a district in the City of Westminster, London.

Mayfair is a residential and commercial area dominated by terraces of town houses. In Grosvenor Square there are several memorials with an American theme, including a memorial garden commemorating the September 11 attacks, due to the former presence on that square of the US Embassy. At the southern end of the district, the courtyard of Burlington House (home of the Royal Academy of Arts) on Piccadilly is frequently used as a temporary exhibition space for artworks.

== List ==
Image	Title / subject	Location and coordinates	Date	Artist / designer	Architect / other	Type	Designation	Notes
	Bust of Sekhmet	Sotheby's, 34–35 New Bond Street	c. 1320 BC			Bust		
More images	Statue of William Pitt the Younger	Hanover Square 51°30′49″N 0°08′37″W	1831	Francis Leggatt Chantrey	—N/a	Statue	Grade II	Unveiled 22 August 1831; there was an attempt by reformist opponents of Pitt to pull the statue down on the morning of the unveiling. Concerns for the work's security might have been the reason for the unusually tall plinth.
More images	Fountain Nymph	Berkeley Square 51.509116°N 0.145293°W	1867	Alexander Munro	—N/a	Fountain with sculpture	Grade II	Pedestal inscribed THE GIFT/ OF/ HENRY 3RD MARQUIS OF LANSDOWNE. This Fountain Nymph was Munro's second treatment of the theme after that for the memorial to Herbert Ingram in Boston, Lincolnshire (1862–1863). He also produced a smaller marble version of the Berkeley Square Nymph, which was installed in a public garden in Oxford in around 1970.
	Architectural sculpture	31 Old Bond Street	1898–1900	Farmer and Brindley after Léon-Joseph Chavalliaud	Arthur Beresford Pite	Reliefs	Grade II	The Michelangelesque crouching figures on the first storey are typical of the architect's work, while the draped female figures on the second storey evoke reliefs by Jean Goujon. The other detailing has been called "discreetly perverse".
	Drinking fountain	Mount Street Gardens 51°30′35″N 0°08′57″W	1892	—N/a	Ernest George	Fountain with sculpture	Grade II	Inscribed THIS FOUNTAIN WAS ERECTED BY HENRY LOFTS IN/ RECOGNITION OF MANY HAPPY YEARS IN MOUNT STREET/ SIR ERNEST GEORGE. RA FECIT 1892. Lofts was an estate agent, and George an architect, to the Grosvenor estate. Lofts's office was in Mount Street, which was partly rebuilt by his firm with George as architect.
	Portal sculpture	Sotheby's, 6–7 St George Street	c. 1904–1905	Louis Fritz Roselieb	Charles Worley	Architectural sculpture	Grade II	
	Arms of John Compton Cavendish, 4th Baron Chesham	Burlington Arcade, Piccadilly façade	1911	?	Arthur Beresford Pite	Architectural sculpture	Grade II	
	Painting	Colnaghi, 144–146 New Bond Street	1911	Henry Poole	Lanchester and Rickards	Architectural sculpture	—N/a	
	Assumption of the Virgin	Mount Street Gardens entrance of the Church of the Immaculate Conception, Farm Street	1914	?	W. H. Romaine-Walker	Tympanum	Grade II*	
	Science	70–71 New Bond Street	c. 1914–1915	Thomas Rudge	Palgrave & Co.	Architectural sculpture	—N/a	
	Commerce	70–71 New Bond Street	c. 1914–1915	Louis Fritz Roselieb	Palgrave & Co.	Architectural sculpture	—N/a	
	Art	70–71 New Bond Street	c. 1914–1915	Louis Fritz Roselieb	Palgrave & Co.	Architectural sculpture	—N/a	
	Architectural sculpture	Burlington Arcade, Piccadilly façade	1931	Benjamin Clemens	Arthur Beresford Pite	Architectural sculpture	Grade II	
	Arms of John Compton Cavendish, 4th Baron Chesham	Burlington Arcade, Burlington Gardens façade	1937	?	William George Sinning	Relief	Grade II	
More images	Statue of Franklin D. Roosevelt	Grosvenor Square 51°30′42″N 0°09′06″W	1948	William Reid Dick	B. W. L. Gallannaugh; Mary Jenks (lettering)	Statue	Grade II	Unveiled 12 April 1948 by Eleanor Roosevelt. The standing pose is intended to recall one of the moments when Roosevelt took the oath of office; he usually used a wheelchair due to his paralytic illness. Winston Churchill, who first proposed the statue, had hoped for a seated portrayal of the President as a pendant to the statue of Abraham Lincoln on Parliament Square.
More images	Time–Life Screen	New Bond Street	1952–1953	Henry Moore	Michael Rosenauer	Architectural sculpture	Grade II*	
	Eagle	24 Grosvenor Square (the former US Embassy)	1960	Theodore Roszak	Eero Saarinen	Architectural sculpture	Grade II	
	Crouching Figure No. 4	Carlos Place 51°30′36″N 0°08′57″W	1973	Emilio Greco	Luca Clavarino (1987 setting)	Sculpture	—N/a	Unveiled 20 November 1987.
More images	Horse and Rider	Corner of New Bond Street and Burlington Gardens	1974–1975	Elisabeth Frink	—N/a	Equestrian statue	Grade II	Frink's catalogue raisonné notes that these figures personify "the most desirable masculine qualities", namely "speed, resilience, intelligence, loyalty, affection, courage, sensitivity, beauty and free sensuality". Another cast was erected in Winchester High Street in 1983. Previously situated on Dover Street near the junction with Piccadilly, the work was moved to its current location in 2018 to mark the opening of the Royal Academy's new entrance at 6 Burlington Gardens.
More images	Statue of Dwight D. Eisenhower	Grosvenor Square 51°30′42″N 0°09′10″W	1969	Robert Dean	Mayell Hart and Associates	Statue	—N/a	Unveiled 23 January 1989. A gift from the people of Kansas City, Missouri. Other casts of this statue are at West Point Military Academy and Eisenhower's burial place in Abilene, Kansas.
	Hat box motifs	Bond Street tube station Jubilee line platforms	1979	Tom Eckersley	—N/a	Tile motifs	—N/a	
More images	RAF Eagle Squadrons Memorial	Grosvenor Square 51°30′40″N 0°09′04″W	1986	Elisabeth Frink	T. A. Kempster	Memorial with sculpture	Grade II	Unveiled 12 May 1986.
	Ducking Pond Row Fountain	Hanover Square 51°30′50″N 0°08′38″W	1988	Paul Cooper	—N/a	Fountain with sculpture	—N/a	Originally erected in Bond Street.
More images	Taichi Spin Kick	St Andrew's Building, 17 Old Park Lane 51°30′17″N 0°09′00″W	1991	Ju Ming	—N/a	Sculpture	—N/a	
More images	Allies Winston Churchill and Franklin D. Roosevelt	New Bond Street 51°30′38″N 0°08′33″W	1995	Lawrence Holofcener	—N/a	Sculptural group	—N/a	Unveiled 2 May 1995, shortly before the 50th anniversary of VE Day, by Princess Margaret. The sculptor's wife gifted the group to the nation, but the Royal Fine Art Commission ruled out a location in a central London park. The Bond Street Association then expressed an interest in the work.
	Helix	1–4 Curzon Street	1998	Eilìs O'Connell		Architectural sculpture	—N/a	
	London	Lancashire Court, on the approach to Handel & Hendrix in London 51°30′47″N 0°08′45″W	2001	Michael Czerwiǹski (with Ray Howell)	—N/a	Tile mural	—N/a	Scenes of the city in ancient and modern times, hand-painted and in relief.
	Inscriptions	21 Davies Street	c. 2003–2005	Ian Hamilton Finlay	Kohn Pederson Fox	Inscriptions	—N/a	Quotations from the French revolutionary Louis Antoine de Saint-Just are inscribed on the terracotta façade: "Too many laws, too few examples" and "Les Mots Juste et Injuste Sont Entendus Par Toutes Les Consciences"
	Verge	23 Savile Row	2003–2008	Joel Shapiro	Eric Parry	Architectural sculpture		
	Salmon Leap	Outside 40 Berkeley Square 51°30′35″N 0°08′49″W	2004	Michael Cooper	—N/a	Sculpture	—N/a	Refers to the River Tyburn which once ran nearby.
	Granite Sculptures	Curzon Square 51°30′22″N 0°09′03″W	2004	John Aiken	Rolfe Judd	Sculptures	—N/a	The bench-like sculptures are formed from black granite from Zimbabwe and silver-grey granite from Portugal spliced together.
	Untitled	Princes Street 51°30′52″N 0°08′34″W	2004	Alexander Beleschenko	—N/a	Glass panels on building	—N/a	
More images	Handbag Heads, or Entrance Sculpture	1 Hanover Street	2004/2005	Bruce McLean	Sheppard Robson	Architectural sculpture		
	Aspiration	In front of Leconfield House, Curzon Street 51°30′23″N 0°08′59″W	2006	John Brown	—N/a	Sculpture	—N/a	
	New Burlington Flare	New Burlington Place 51°30′45″N 0°08′26″W	2006	Michael Bleyenberg	—N/a	Light installation	—N/a	
More images	Recalling – Revealing – Remaining	20 Grafton Street	2006	Guðrún Sigríður Haraldsdóttir	—N/a	Architectural sculpture	—N/a	
	Rail Diversions	1 Grafton Street	2009	Tom Phillips	Hamiltons Architects (renovation)	Railing	—N/a	
More images	The Prophecy of Teiresias	Richard Green Gallery, 33 New Bond Street	2011	Alexander Stoddart	George Saumarez Smith of ADAM Architecture	Bas-reliefs	—N/a	The three reliefs, representing scenes from the Odyssey, are an allegory of "the extreme lengths modern art has taken to distance itself from its origin in Greece".
More images	Silence Simon Milton	Mount Street / Carlos Place 51°30′37″N 0°08′57″W	2011	—N/a	Tadao Ando et al.	Water feature	—N/a	A raised granite-edged pool into which two trees are set, and which emits clouds of water vapour for fifteen seconds every fifteen minutes. Jointly commissioned by the Grosvenor Estate and the Connaught Hotel; Blair Associates Architects and the Building Design Partnership were also involved the project.
	Shop Till You Drop	Bruton Lane 51°30′38″N 0°08′37″W	2011	Banksy	—N/a	Graffiti	—N/a	
More images	Statue of Ronald Reagan	Grosvenor Square 51°30′39″N 0°09′09″W	2011	Chas Fagan	—N/a	Statue	—N/a	Unveiled 4 July 2011. Westminster City Council's rule that a person may only be commemorated by a statue 10 years after their death was waived so that Margaret Thatcher could perform the unveiling, but she proved too unwell to attend the ceremony. A fragment of the Berlin Wall is incorporated into the pedestal.
More images	Terza Rima	9–15 Sackville Street 51°30′34″N 0°08′18″W	2011–2012	Rebecca Salter	JM Architects	Designs screenprinted onto windows and a bronze panel	—N/a	
More images	Three Figures	Bourdon Place	2012	Neal French	—N/a	Statues	—N/a	Unveiled by Twiggy, one of the work's subjects, on 31 May 2012. A plaque nearby provides the following exegesis: "A passing shopper stumbles upon/ Terence Donovan photographing the model Twiggy/ near to his studio in 1960s Mayfair".
	Portcullis Gates	33 Davies Street 51°30′43″N 0°08′53″W	2013	Wendy Ramshaw	HOK	Gates	—N/a	3.6 metres (12 ft)-high bronze gates with abstract patterns of "flowing lines and intersecting arcs ... reflecting the life and style of Mayfair", which can be lowered at night in the manner of a portcullis.
	An Age, An Instant	New Burlington Mews	2014	Rona Smith	—N/a	Gate	—N/a	Unveiled 29 April 2014. The artist took her inspiration from turn-of-the-century pocket watches, as this locale was a centre for the watchmaking trade in the early 20th century when the building's façade was rebuilt.
	Gates and railings	Mayfair Chambers, 15 Grosvenor Hill	2014	Richard Galpin	3DReid	Gates and railings	—N/a	
	ROOM	Beaumont Hotel, Brown Hart Gardens	2014	Antony Gormley		Sculpture	—N/a	
	Cinch	Burlington Arcade, Burlington Gardens façade	2017	Antony Gormley		Sculpture		
	Horizon Line	Bond Street station	2017	Darren Almond	John McAslan + Partners	Installation	—N/a	
	Shadow Line	Bond Street station	2017	Darren Almond	John McAslan + Partners	Installation	—N/a	
	Time Line	Bond Street station	2017	Darren Almond	John McAslan + Partners	Installation	—N/a	
	Everyone I've Ever Known	Medici Courtyard, behind Bond Street station	2020	Rhys Coren		Mural	—N/a	
	Mosaik	Bourdon Street entrance from Grosvenor Street	2021	Albert Oehlen		Mosaic	—N/a	
	The Dorchester Sphere Platinum Jubilee of Elizabeth II	Forecourt of The Dorchester 51.5070°N 0.1523°W	2022	Jill Berelowitz	—N/a	Sculpture	—N/a	
	Anatomy of Time	65 Davies Street	2023	Clare Twomey	PLP Architecture	Architectural sculpture	—N/a	Leaf shapes based on William Curtis's Flora Londinensis, tracing the path of the Tyburn.
More images	Landline	Hanover Square	2023	Sean Scully		Sculpture	—N/a	
	Swarm	1 Grosvenor Square	2023	Alison Wilding		Sculpture	—N/a	
	Elephant	Aspinall's, Curzon Street 51°30′23″N 0°08′58″W	?	?	—N/a	Statue	—N/a	The gambling club's founder, John Aspinall, was a noted wildlife enthusiast whose two animal parks in Kent, Howletts and Port Lympne, are funded by the club's proceeds.

=== Burlington House ===
Sydney Smirke's remodelling of Burlington House for the Royal Academy of Arts in 1872–1873 included adding an additional storey to house the Diploma Galleries; the resulting windowless exterior was adorned with statues of artists in niches. A freestanding statue by Alfred Drury of Joshua Reynolds, the Academy's founding president, was installed at the centre of the courtyard in 1931. In 2002 the courtyard was refurbished to a design by Michael Hopkins, after the Academy received a donation from Walter and Leonore Annenberg. At the suggestion of the architect Ian Ritchie, the lights and fountains set into the pavement were arranged in the position of the planets, the Moon and some of the bright stars as they would have appeared over London on the night of Reynolds's birth. The courtyard is used as an exhibition space for temporary artworks.

Image	Title / subject	Location and coordinates	Date	Artist / designer	Architect / other	Type	Designation	Notes
	Statue of Phidias	Second-floor façade, 1st niche from left	c. 1872	Joseph Durham	Sydney Smirke	Statue in niche	Grade II*	
	Statue of Leonardo da Vinci	Second-floor façade, 2nd niche from left	c. 1872	Edward Bowring Stephens	Sydney Smirke	Statue in niche	Grade II*	
	Statue of John Flaxman	Second-floor façade, 3rd niche from left	c. 1872	Henry Weekes	Sydney Smirke	Statue in niche	Grade II*	
	Statue of Raphael	Second-floor façade, 4th niche from left	c. 1872	Henry Weekes	Sydney Smirke	Statue in niche	Grade II*	
	Statue of Michelangelo	Second-floor façade, 5th niche from left	c. 1872	William Calder Marshall	Sydney Smirke	Statue in niche	Grade II*	
	Statue of Titian	Second-floor façade, 6th niche from left	c. 1872	William Calder Marshall	Sydney Smirke	Statue in niche	Grade II*	
	Statue of Joshua Reynolds	Second-floor façade, 7th niche from left	c. 1872	Edward Bowring Stephens	Sydney Smirke	Statue in niche	Grade II*	
	Statue of Christopher Wren	Second-floor façade, 8th niche from left	c. 1872	Edward Bowring Stephens	Sydney Smirke	Statue in niche	Grade II*	
	Statue of William of Wykeham	Second-floor façade, 9th niche from left	c. 1872	Joseph Durham	Sydney Smirke	Statue in niche	Grade II*	
	Architectural sculpture	Ground-floor arcade	c. 1872	John Birnie Philip	Sydney Smirke	Architectural sculpture	Grade II*	
More images	Royal Academy War Memorial	West wall, within ground-floor arcade	1922	Emile Madeline and Herbert Tyson Smith	Trenwith Wills	Plaque	Grade II*	
	Artists' Rifles War Memorial	East wall, within ground-floor arcade	1922	William Drinkwater Gough and Arthur Ayres	Geoffrey Webb	Plaque	Grade II*	
More images	Statue of Joshua Reynolds	Annenberg Courtyard 51°30′32″N 0°08′22″W	1931	Alfred Drury	Giles Gilbert Scott	Statue	Grade II	Unveiled 12 December 1931. Drury was awarded the commission in 1917, but was too preoccupied with war memorials in the following years to proceed with the work. In 1926 he had to start over with a new composition after his studio assistant failed to keep the first clay figure moist every night, which had led to its disintegration.

=== 6 Burlington Gardens ===
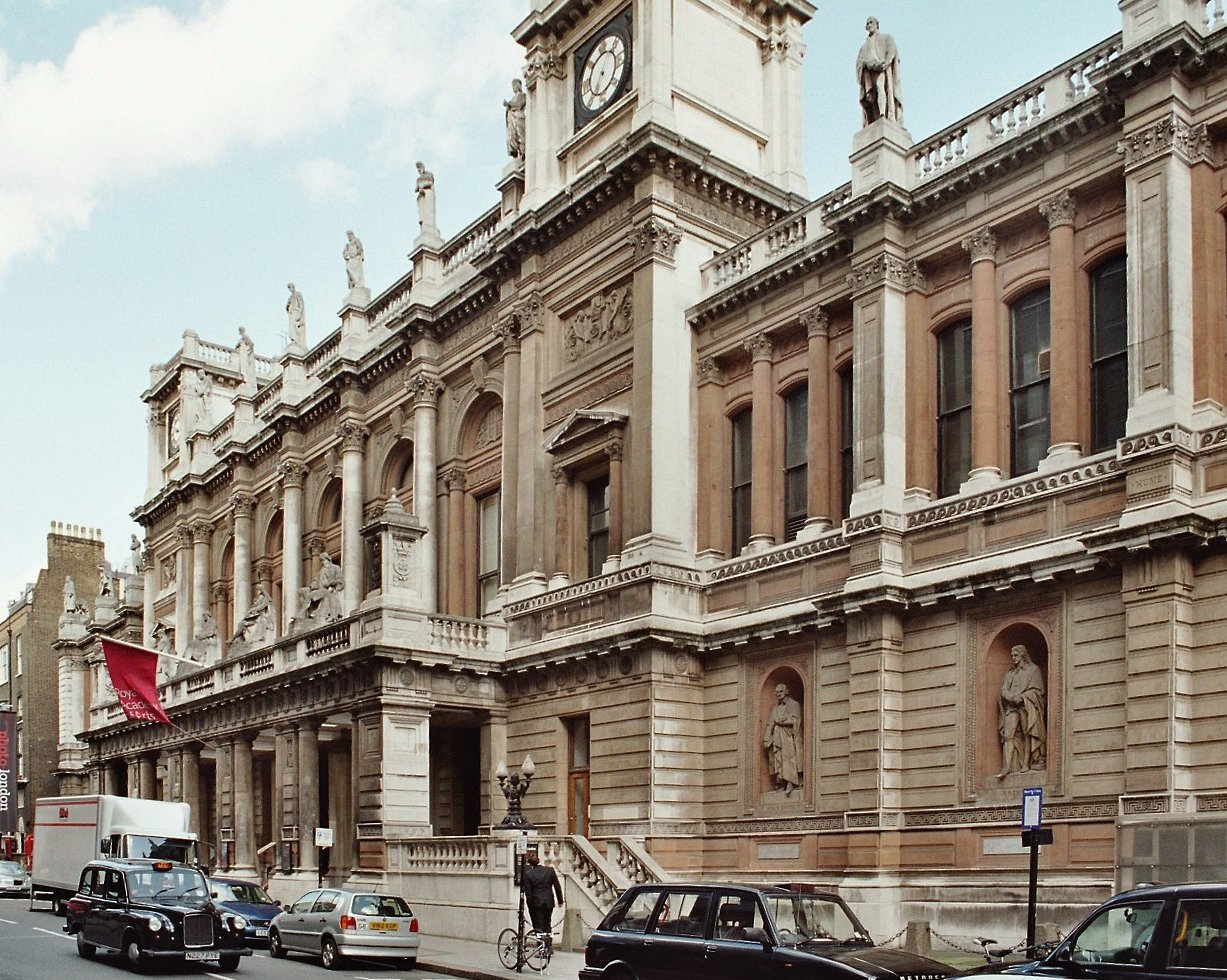
6 Burlington Gardens

6 Burlington Gardens, a Grade II* listed building now used by the Royal Academy, was designed by James Pennethorne in 1866–1867 for the University of London. In 1868 the university's Senate proposed the subjects of the 22 statues for the façade: Isaac Newton to represent Science, Jeremy Bentham for Law, John Milton for the Arts and William Harvey for Medicine; Galen, Cicero, Aristotle, Plato, Archimedes and Tribonian (the last of whom was replaced in the final scheme by Justinian) as representatives of "ancient culture", and the "illustrious foreigners" Gottfried Wilhelm Leibniz, Georges Cuvier, Carl Linnaeus, Galileo Galilei, Johann Wolfgang von Goethe and Pierre-Simon Laplace. Finally, Adam Smith, John Locke, Francis Bacon, John Hunter, William Shakespeare (replaced by David Hume) and John Dalton (replaced by Humphry Davy) were included as "English worthies" (although Smith, Hunter and Hume were Scottish). Shakespeare was substituted as his achievement was felt to be "independent of academic influence"; he was instead commemorated with a statue apart, inside the building.

Image	Title / subject	Location and coordinates	Date	Artist / designer	Architect / other	Type	Designation	Notes
	Statue of Gottfried Wilhelm Leibniz	First storey	1870s	Patrick MacDowell	James Pennethorne	Statue in niche	Grade II*	
	Statue of Georges Cuvier	First storey	1870s	Patrick MacDowell	James Pennethorne	Statue in niche	Grade II*	
	Statue of Carl Linnaeus	First storey	1870s	Patrick MacDowell	James Pennethorne	Statue in niche	Grade II*	
	Statue of Adam Smith	First storey	1870s	William Theed	James Pennethorne	Statue in niche	Grade II*	
	Statue of John Locke	First storey	1870s	William Theed	James Pennethorne	Statue in niche	Grade II*	
	Statue of Francis Bacon	First storey	1870s	William Theed	James Pennethorne	Statue in niche	Grade II*	
	Statue of Isaac Newton	Above the portico	1870s	Joseph Durham	James Pennethorne	Seated statue	Grade II*	
	Statue of Jeremy Bentham	Above the portico	1870s	Joseph Durham	James Pennethorne	Seated statue	Grade II*	
	Statue of John Milton	Above the portico	1870s	Joseph Durham	James Pennethorne	Seated statue	Grade II*	
	Statue of William Harvey	Above the portico	1870s	Joseph Durham	James Pennethorne	Seated statue	Grade II*	
	Statue of Galileo Galilei	Eastern balustrade	1870s	Edward William Wyon	James Pennethorne	Statue	Grade II*	
	Statue of Johann Wolfgang von Goethe	Eastern balustrade	1870s	Edward William Wyon	James Pennethorne	Statue	Grade II*	
	Statue of Pierre-Simon Laplace	Eastern balustrade	1870s	Edward William Wyon	James Pennethorne	Statue	Grade II*	
	Statue of Galen	Central balustrade	1870s	James Sherwood Westmacott	James Pennethorne	Statue	Grade II*	
	Statue of Cicero	Central balustrade	1870s	James Sherwood Westmacott	James Pennethorne	Statue	Grade II*	
	Statue of Aristotle	Central balustrade	1870s	James Sherwood Westmacott	James Pennethorne	Statue	Grade II*	
	Statue of Plato	Central balustrade	1870s	William F. Woodington	James Pennethorne	Statue	Grade II*	
	Statue of Archimedes	Central balustrade	1870s	William F. Woodington	James Pennethorne	Statue	Grade II*	
	Statue of Justinian I	Central balustrade	1870s	William F. Woodington	James Pennethorne	Statue	Grade II*	
	Statue of John Hunter	Western balustrade	1870s	Matthew Noble	James Pennethorne	Statue	Grade II*	
	Statue of David Hume	Western balustrade	1870s	Matthew Noble	James Pennethorne	Statue	Grade II*	
	Statue of Humphry Davy	Western balustrade	1870s	Matthew Noble	James Pennethorne	Statue	Grade II*	

== Bibliography ==
- Blackwood, John (1989). London's Immortals: The Complete Outdoor Commemorative Statues. London and Oxford: Savoy Press. ISBN 978-0951429600.
- Bradley, Simon; Pevsner, Nikolaus (2003). London: Westminster. The Buildings of England. Vol. 6. London and New Haven: Yale University Press. ISBN 978-0-300-09595-1.
- Ward-Jackson, Philip (2011). Public Sculpture of Historic Westminster: Volume 1. Public Sculpture of Britain. Vol. 14. Liverpool: Liverpool University Press. ISBN 978-1-84631-691-3.
