= Westmacott =

Westmacott is a British surname. Notable people with the surname include:

- Charles Molloy Westmacott, (c.1788–1868), British journalist and author
- Captain Herbert Westmacott, (1952–1980), British special forces officer killed in action
- James Sherwood Westmacott, (1823–1900), British sculptor
- Mary Westmacott, an alias of Agatha Christie
- Mike Westmacott (1925–2012), British mountaineer
- Percy G. B. Westmacott (1830–1917), British mechanical engineer
- Sir Peter Westmacott (born 1950), British diplomat
- Sir Richard Westmacott (1775–1856), British sculptor
  - Richard Westmacott (disambiguation), several people
- Spencer Westmacott (1885–1960), New Zealand farmer and memoirist
