= John Vardy =

English architect

- Born: February 1718; Durham, England, Great Britain
- Died: 17 May 1765 (aged 47)
- Children: 1 son

John Vardy (February 1718 – 17 May 1765) was an English architect attached to the Royal Office of Works from 1736. He was a close follower of the neo-Palladian architect William Kent.

John Vardy was born to a simple working family in Durham. His early training is obscure. His career at the Office of Works, which demanded most of his attention throughout his life, began in May 1736, when he was appointed Clerk of the Works at Greenwich Hospital. He was Clerk of the Works at Hampton Court Palace, January 1745 to 1746; Clerk of the Works at Whitehall, Palace of Westminster and St James's Palace, December 1746 to 1754; Kensington Palace, July 1754 to 1761. He also served as Clerk of the Works at Chelsea Hospital and as Surveyor to the Mint.

== Vardy and William Kent ==
His relations with William Kent, his senior at the Board of Works, began around 1736 and remained close. Vardy prepared for publication the classic of the Palladian revival, Some Designs of Mr. Inigo Jones and Mr. William Kent, 1744. He redrew and engraved Kent's drawing of the Great Hall at Hampton Court, and drew up Kent's ambitious designs for new Houses of Parliament, under Kent's direction. After Kent's death Vardy and Thomas Robinson saw Kent's Horse Guards, Whitehall, through to completion; Vardy published engravings of his redrawings of the plan and elevation.

== Private clients ==
Vardy's routine at the Office of Works constrained his time to devote to private clients. His London buildings have mostly suffered the fate of city constructions and have gone. His most prominent surviving work is Spencer House, St. James's, where, ironically the chief fame is garnered by the very early neoclassical interiors of the upper floor, by James "Athenian" Stuart.

For Joseph Damer, Vardy probably designed Dorchester House, Park Lane, London, begun in 1751–52. He exhibited designs for interiors at the Society of Artists, 1764. The house was demolished in 1849.

== Family ==
Vardy's will mentions his brother Thomas Vardy, carver in Park Street, Grosvenor Square, and his son, John Vardy Jr. who succeeded his father as Surveyor to the Royal Mint. He remodeled and extended Giacomo Leoni's Queensberry House in Burlington Gardens, for Henry Paget, from 1785 to 1789; as Uxbridge House it survives, housing the Royal Bank of Scotland.

His niece Sarah married the sculptor Richard Westmacott.

== Gallery of architectural work ==
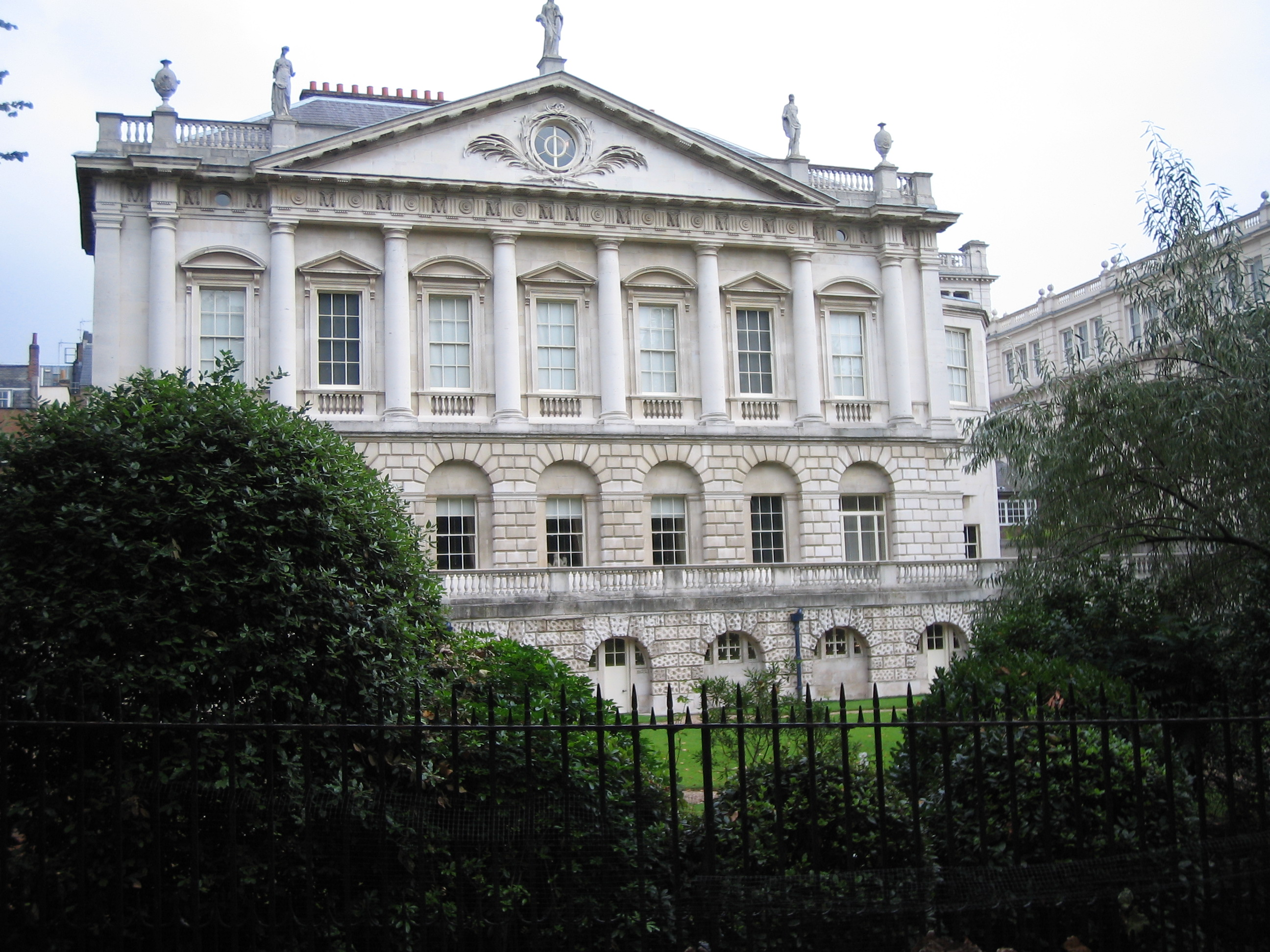
Spencer House, west front

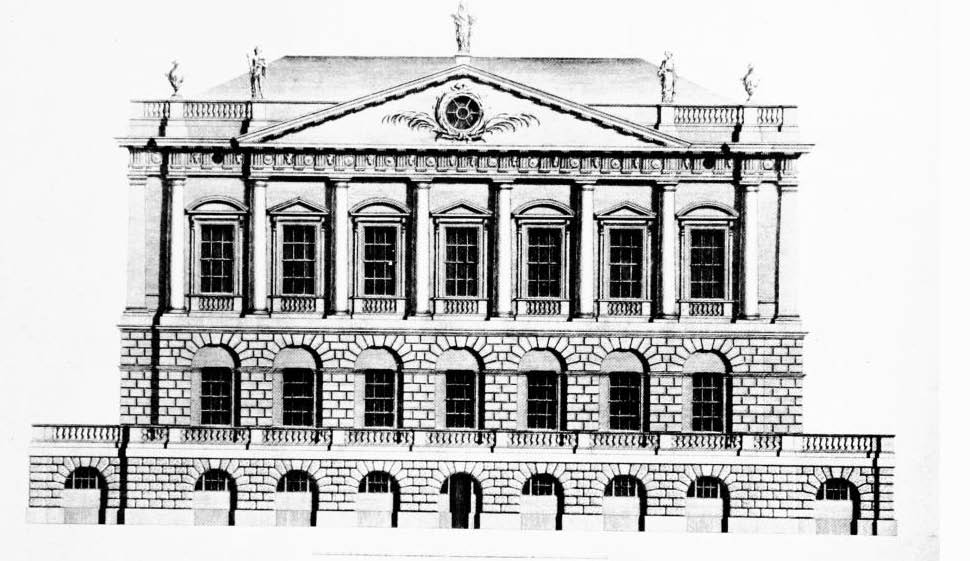
Spencer House, west front

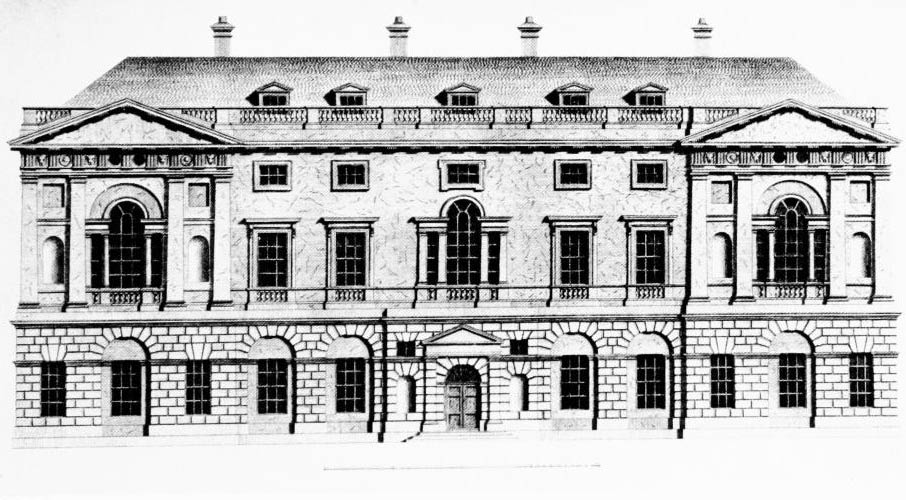
Spencer House, north front

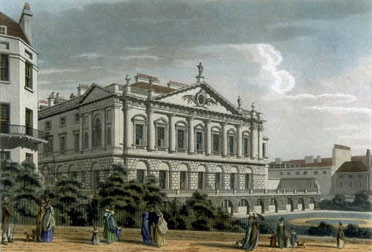
Spencer House, c. 1800
