= 6 Burlington Gardens =

Building in Mayfair, London

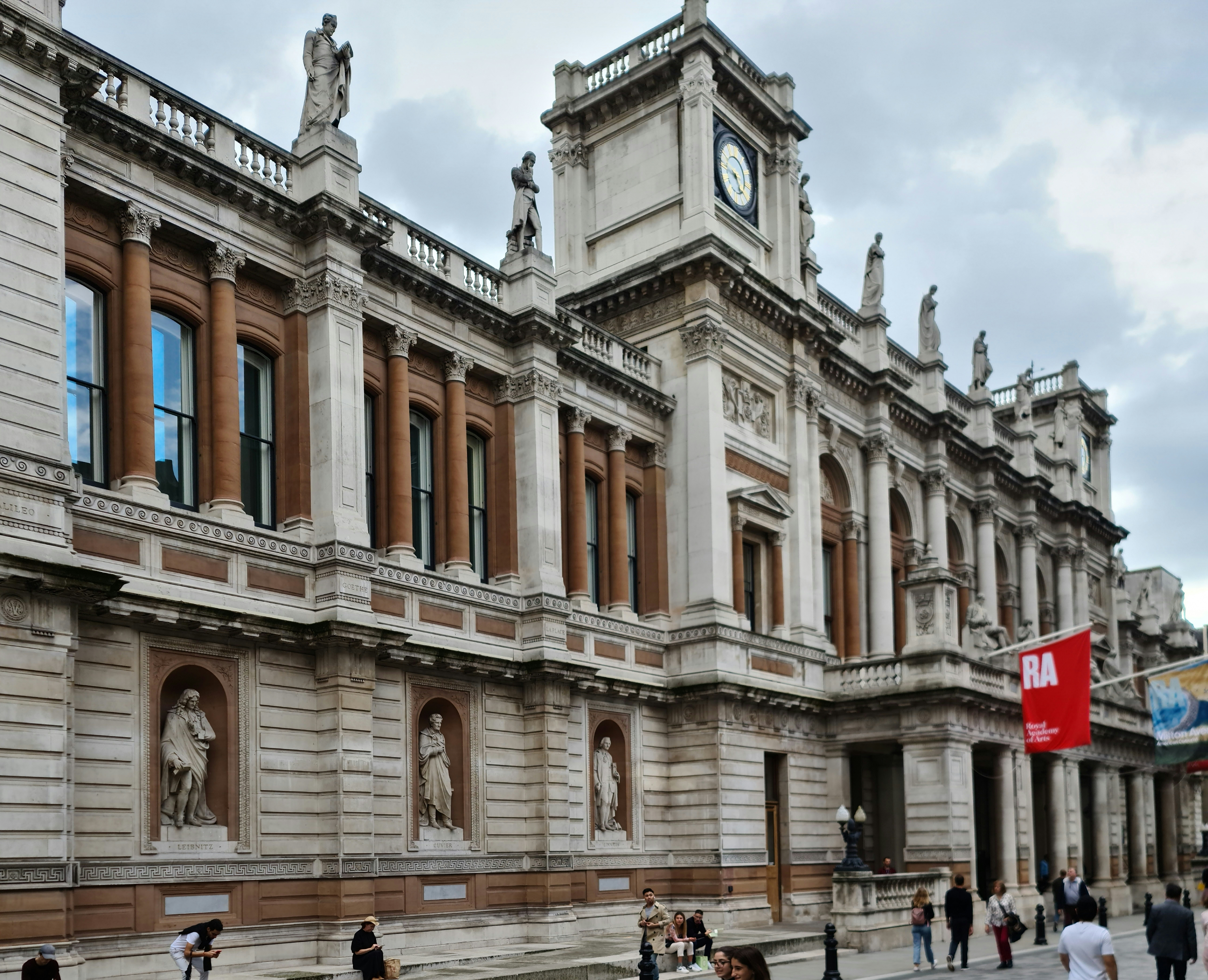
- 6 Burlington Gardens in 2022
- Interactive map of 6 Burlington Gardens
- Coordinates: 51.5097°N 0.1402°W
- Built: 1867–1870
- Architect: Sir James Pennethorne
- Architectural style: Italianate

Listed Building – Grade II*
- Official name: Ethnography Department of the British Museum
- Designated: 9 January 1970
- Reference no.: 1291018

6 Burlington Gardens is a Grade II*-listed building in Mayfair, London. Built for the University of London, it has been used by various institutions in the course of its history, including the Civil Service Commission, the British Museum and, currently, the Royal Academy of Arts.

== History ==
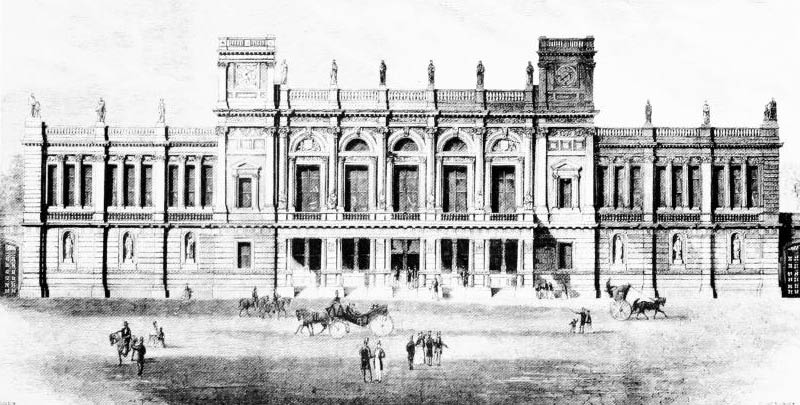
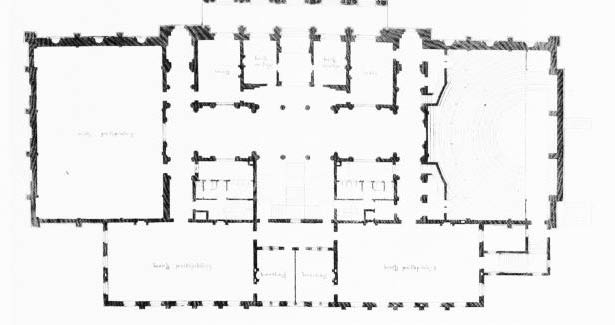
Elevation and plan, 1867

=== University of London and the Civil Service Commission ===
The Italianate building was designed by Sir James Pennethorne between 1867 and 1870 as headquarters for the University of London. It occupied the northernmost section of the former garden of Burlington House. It was a grand building, but not especially large. The University of London is a federal university and this early central building contained little besides examination halls and a few offices; the premises of several of the constituent colleges were larger. The university vacated Burlington Gardens in 1900 for the Imperial Institute building in South Kensington. Briefly the headquarters of the National Antarctic Expedition, in 1902 it was given to the Civil Service Commission. During World War 2 the building was used to hear the appeals of high level British Fascists such as Barry Domvile against their continued internment. One of Domvile's appeals was heard here on 15th April, 1942.

=== Museum of Mankind ===
In 1970, this was the site of the Department of Ethnography of the British Museum, which housed its collections from the Americas, Africa, the Pacific and Australia, as well as tribal Asia and Europe, because of lack of space in the museum's main building in Bloomsbury. Between 1970 and 1997, the building, as the Museum of Mankind, hosted around 75 exhibitions, including many famous ones such as Nomad and City, 1976, and Living Arctic, 1987. It was created by Keeper of Ethnography Adrian Digby in the 1960s, and opened by his successor William Fagg. Fagg was succeeded by Malcolm Mcleod in 1974, and by John Mack in 1990. The museum ceased exhibiting at Burlington Gardens in 1997 and the Department of Ethnography moved back to the British Museum in Bloomsbury in 2004.

=== Royal Academy and private tenants ===
After the ethnography collection's return to Bloomsbury the building was purchased by the Royal Academy. In 1998 an architectural competition was held to connect it with Burlington House, which was won by Michael Hopkins & Partners. This was abandoned as the Heritage Lottery Fund was not persuaded that there was sufficient need for the project, which would have cost £80 million.

In about 2005 the building was brought back into use by the Royal Academy, the tenant of the original wing of Burlington House and the wing which lies between the two buildings. It was used mainly by the Royal Academy Schools. On 29 August 2006, the building was damaged by a fire, but there was no loss of academy artworks as it was being prepared for a future exhibition.

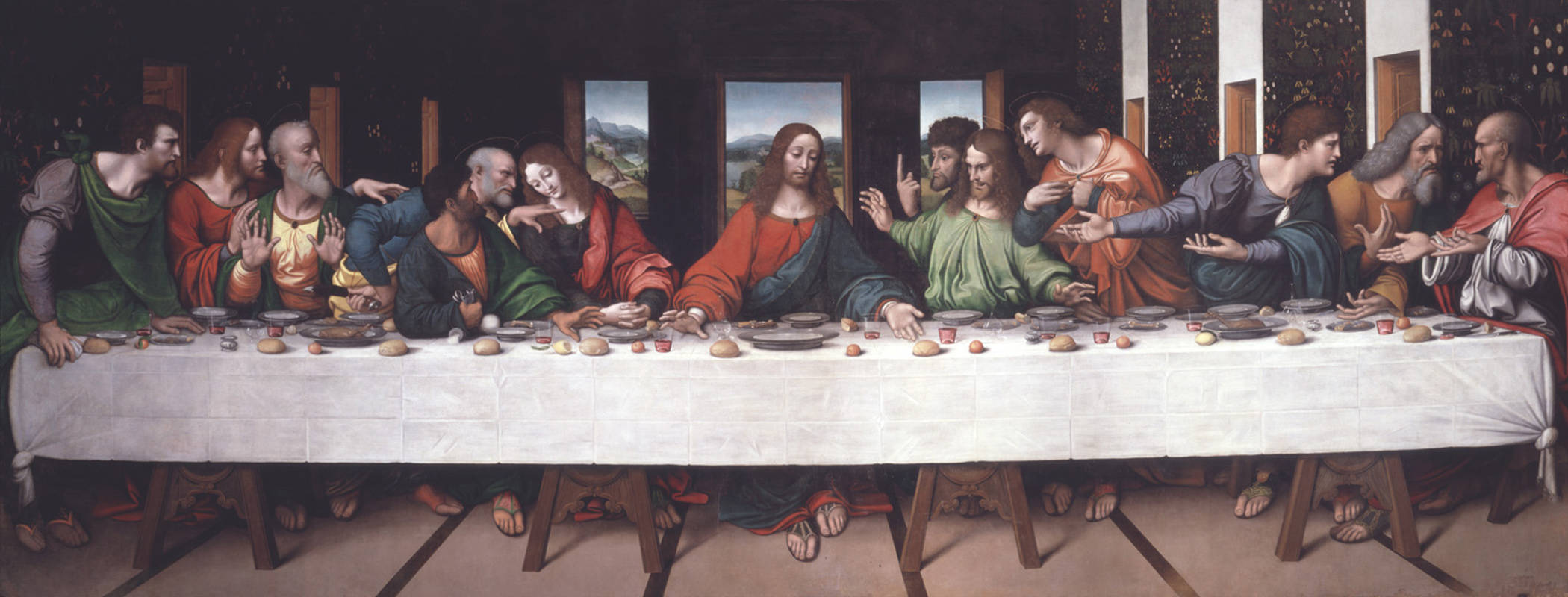
Giampietrino's copy of Leonardo's Last Supper, housed in the Royal Academy's Collection Gallery

In 2006 Colin St John Wilson drew up a masterplan for the whole complex, which included a more modest link between the buildings than that proposed by Hopkins. However, Wilson died the following year, which led to another competition being held in 2008, won by David Chipperfield Architects. In order to raise capital for Chipperfield's design, the building was lent to the commercial gallery Haunch of Venison, which occupied the site from 2009 to 2011 while their existing building was being renovated. In 2012 space in the building was lent to the Pace Gallery, which occupies it on a 15-year lease. A second application to the HLF, for £12.7m to go towards a £36 million project, was successful in 2013. This included a sculpture court in the bridge between the buildings, a lecture hall where that of the University of London originally stood and a permanent home for Giampietrino’s full-size copy of Leonardo da Vinci’s Last Supper. The redevelopment was completed in 2018, in time for the academy's 250th anniversary that year.

== See also ==
- List of public art in Mayfair § 6 Burlington Gardens
- 7 Burlington Gardens
