= Richard Westmacott (disambiguation) =

Richard Westmacott (1775–1856) was a British sculptor.

Richard Westmacott may also refer to

- Richard Westmacott (the elder) (1747–1808), British monument sculptor
- Richard Westmacott (the younger) (1799–1872), British sculptor
- Richard Westmacott (Indian Army officer) (1841–1925), British military officer

== See also ==
- Westmacott
