= Giacomo Leoni =

Italian architect (1686-1746)

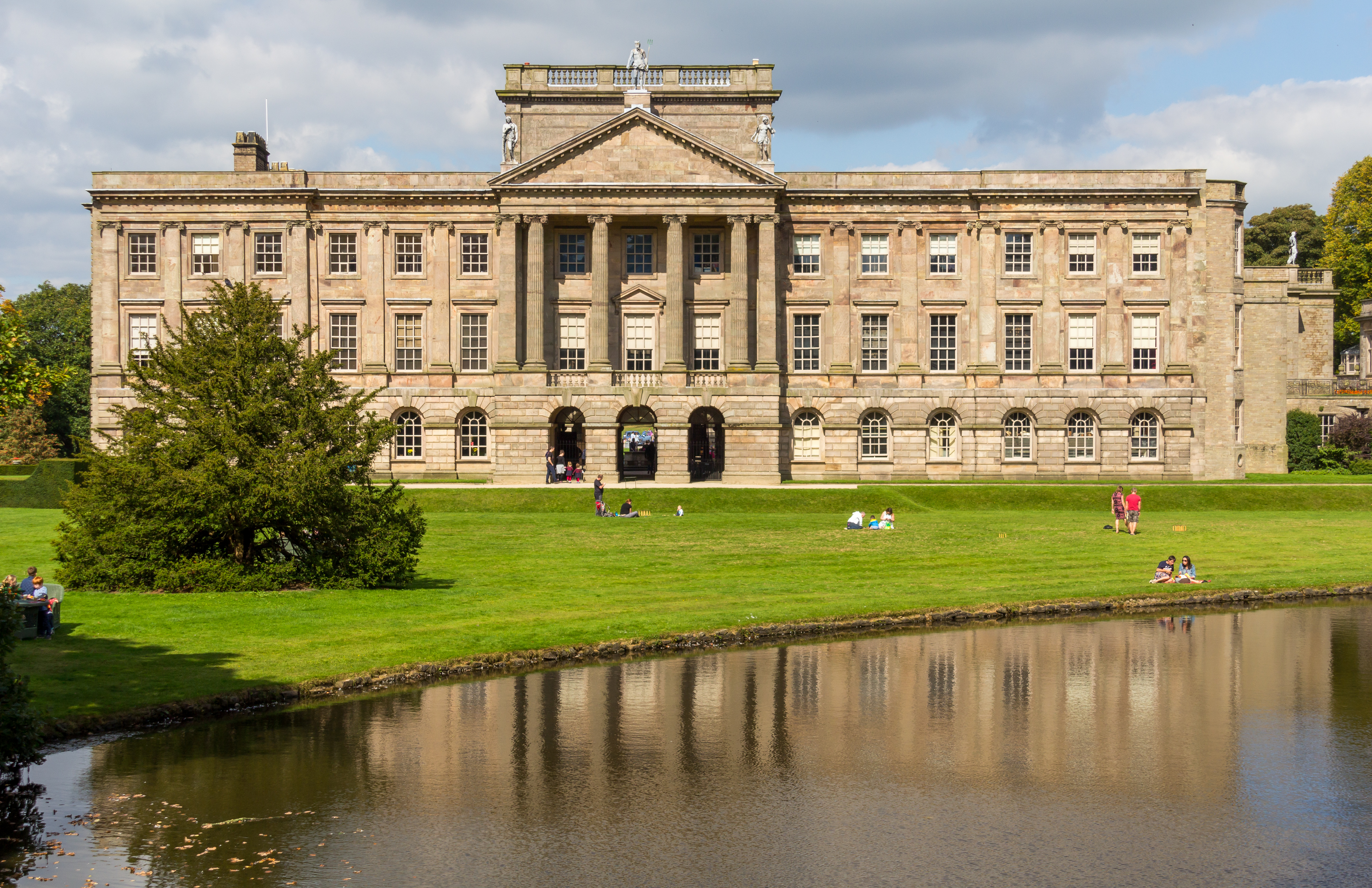
Lyme Park, Cheshire designed by Giacomo Leoni. The original Tudor mansion was transformed by Leoni into an Italian palazzo. The design was altered by English architect Lewis Wyatt's 19th-century addition of the box-like structure surrounding the centre pediment. This squat tower is in place of Leoni's intended cupola.

Giacomo Leoni (Italian: [leˈoːni]; 1686 – 8 June 1746), also known as James Leoni, was an Italian architect, born in Venice. He was a devotee of the work of Florentine Renaissance architect Leon Battista Alberti, who had also been an inspiration for Andrea Palladio. Leoni thus served as a prominent exponent of Palladianism in English architecture, beginning in earnest around 1720. Also loosely referred to as Georgian, this style is rooted in Italian Renaissance architecture.

Having previously worked in Düsseldorf, Leoni arrived in England, where he was to make his name, in 1714, aged 28. His fresh, uncluttered designs, with just a hint of Baroque flamboyance, brought him to the attention of prominent patrons of the arts.

== Early life ==
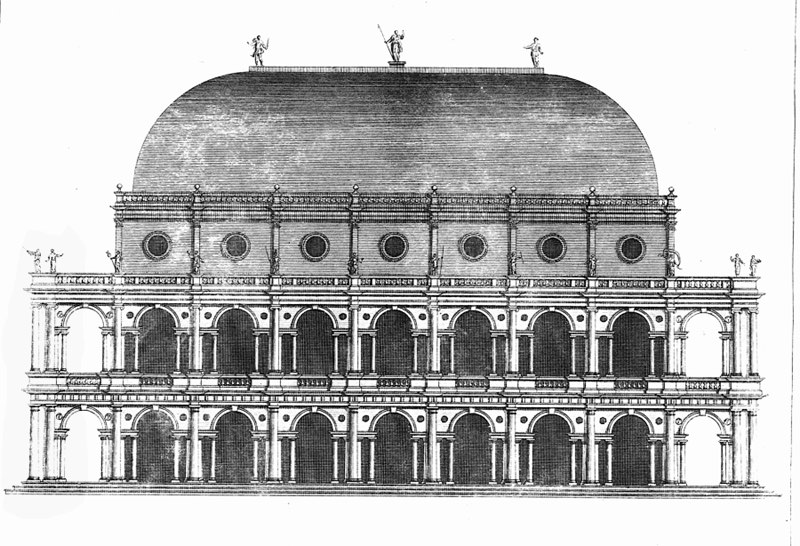
Palladio's design for a Basilica as it appeared drawn by Leoni, in his translation of The Architecture of Palladio in Four Books (3rd. ed. vol. 1, London, 1742, Plate XX).

Leoni's early life is poorly documented. He is first recorded in Düsseldorf in 1708, and arrived in England sometime before 1715. Between 1715 and 1720 he published in instalments the first complete English language edition of Palladio's I Quattro Libri dell'Architettura, which Leoni entitled The Architecture of A. Palladio, in Four Books. The translation was a huge success and went into multiple editions in the following years (illustration, left) Despite Leoni's often eccentric alterations to Palladio's illustrations, his edition became a main vehicle for disseminating the essence of Palladio's style among British designers. The direct impact of Palladio's text was upon building patrons, for these expensive volumes were out of the reach of most builders, who could consult them only briefly in a gentleman's library. In 1738 Isaac Ware, with the encouragement of Richard Boyle, 3rd Earl of Burlington, produced a more accurate translation of Palladio's work with illustrations which were faithful to the originals, but Leoni's changes and inaccuracies continued to influence Palladianism for generations.

On the frontispiece of his edition of Palladio, Leoni titled himself "Architect to his most serene Highness the Elector Palatine." This claim, however, remains unsubstantiated.

Leoni followed his Palladian volume with an English translation of Alberti's De Re Aedificatoria ("On Architecture"), the first modern book on the theories and practice of architecture.

== Works ==
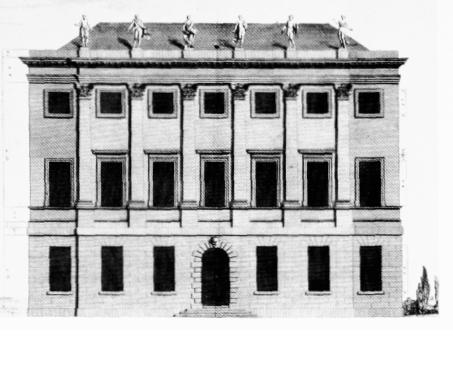
7 Burlington Gardens, later Queensberry House, London. Leoni's first executed design in England, an important architectural landmark as the first London mansion to be built on a terrace with an "antique temple front."

Giacomo Leoni's principal architectural skill was to adapt Alberti's and Palladio's ideals to suit the landed classes in the English countryside, without straying too far from the principles of the great masters. He made Palladian architecture less austere, and adapted his work to suit the location and needs of his clients. The use of red brick as a building component had begun to replace dressed stone during the William and Mary era. Leoni would frequently build in both, depending on availability and what was indigenous to the area of the site.

Leoni's first commissions in England, though for high-profile clients Henry Grey, 1st Duke of Kent and James Stanhope, 1st Earl Stanhope, First Lord of the Treasury, remained unexecuted. His first built design in England was Queensberry House, 7 Burlington Gardens, for John Bligh, Lord Clifton, in 1721. This was to be an important architectural landmark, as the first London mansion to be built on a terrace with an "antique temple front."

Throughout this career in England, Leoni was to be responsible for the design of at least twelve large country houses and at least six London mansions. He is also known to have designed church monuments and memorials.

=== Lyme Park ===
In the early 1720s, Leoni received one of his most important challenges: to transform a great Elizabethan house, Lyme Hall, into a Palladian palace. This he did so sympathetically that internally, large areas of the house remained completely unaltered, and the wood carvings by Grinling Gibbons were left intact. In the central courtyard Leoni achieved the Palladian style by hiding the irregularities and lack of symmetry of the earlier house in a series of arcades around the courtyard.

The transformation at Lyme was a success. However, it has been claimed that the central Ionic portico, the focal point of the south front, was a little spoiled later by English architect Lewis Wyatt's 19th-century addition of a box-like structure above its pediment. This squat tower, known as a "hamper," is on the site of Leoni's intended cupola, which was rejected by the owner.

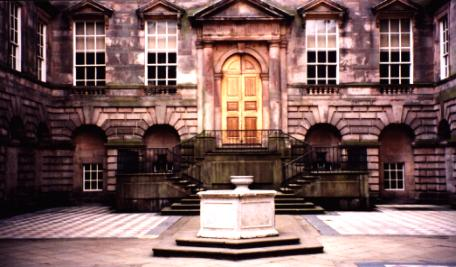
The inner courtyard, and main entrance at Lyme Park. The rusticated walls and bold fenestration evoke a strong Italian atmosphere, while the mannerist arcades, many of them blind, conceal the Tudor irregularities of design.

Leoni reconstructed Lyme in an early form of what was to become known as the Palladian style, with the secondary, domestic and staff rooms on a rusticated ground floor, above which was a piano nobile, formally accessed by an exterior double staircase from the courtyard. Above the piano nobile were the more private room and less formal rooms for the family.

In a true Palladian house (one villa designed by Palladio himself), the central portion behind the portico would contain the principal rooms, while the lower flanking wings were domestic offices usually leading to terminating pavilions which would often be agricultural in use. It was this adaption of the wings and pavilions into the body of the house that was to be a hallmark of the 18th-century Palladianism that spread across Europe, and of which Leoni was an early exponent. At Lyme, while the central portico, resting upon a base reminiscent of Palladio's Villa Pisani, dominates the façade, the flanking wings are short, and of the same height as the central block, and the terminating pavilions are merely suggested by a slight projection in the facade. Thus in no way could the portico be seen as a corps de logis. This has led some architectural commentators to describe the south front as more Baroque than Palladian in style. However, at this early stage of his career Leoni appears to have been still following the earlier and more renaissance-inspired Palladianism which had been imported to England in the 17th century by Inigo Jones. This is evident by his use of classical pilasters throughout the south façade, in the same way that Jones had used them, a century earlier, at the Banqueting House, Whitehall and Leoni's mentor, Alberti, had employed them at the Palazzo Rucellai in the 1440s. These features, coupled with the heavy mannerist use of rustication on the ground floor with segmented arches and windows, is the reason that Lyme appears more "Italian" than many other English houses in the Palladian style and has led to it being described as "the boldest Palladian building in England."

=== Clandon House ===
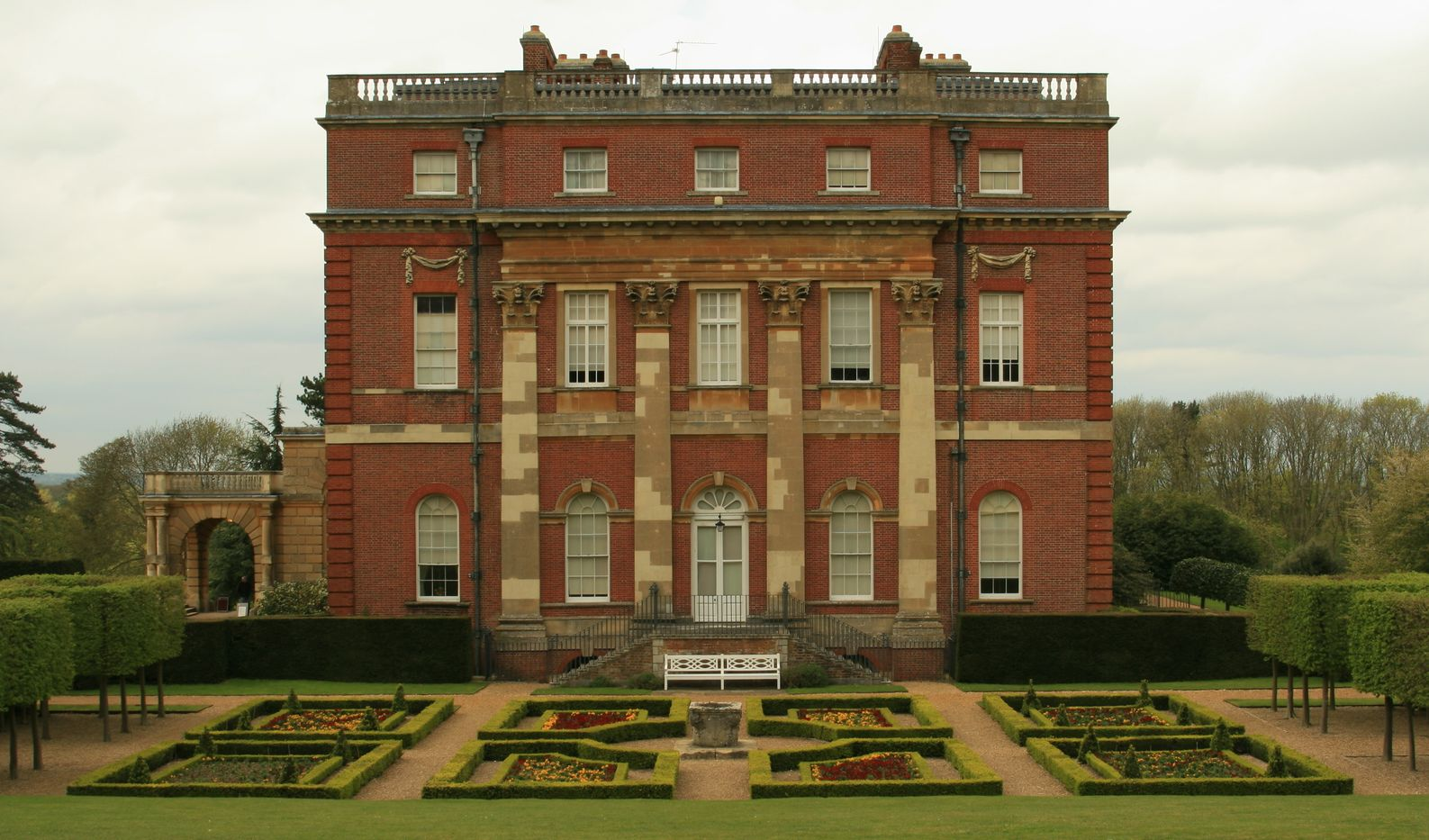
Clandon House, considered by some to be Leoni's masterpiece.

In 1730 Leoni was commissioned by the Thomas Onslow, 2nd Baron Onslow to build what is probably his masterpiece, Clandon House, near Guildford in Surrey. The result was a house of "exuberant grandeur and at the same time endearing naivety". This coupling of grandeur and naivety was to become Leoni's own style, as he mixed the Baroque and Palladian styles. Clandon was built of a fiery red brick, with the west front dressed with stone pilasters and medallion ornamentation. The interiors contrasted with the exterior: the huge double-height marble hall is in muted stone colours, to provide a foil for the vibrant colours of the adjoining suite of staterooms. The interiors were altered slightly later in the 18th century, but here the house was fortunate; the changes were made in the style of Robert Adam, so were sympathetic to Leoni's original intentions. The marble hall is considered one of the most imposing 18th-century architectural features in England, as are the magnificent plasterwork ceilings. From this point in time the house was largely unaltered, until the 2015 fire. A fire in April 2015 left the house gutted, apart from one room. Much of the architecture, walls, ceilings, floors and historic artefacts that the building housed were destroyed. The house currently remains a shell.

=== Moor Park ===
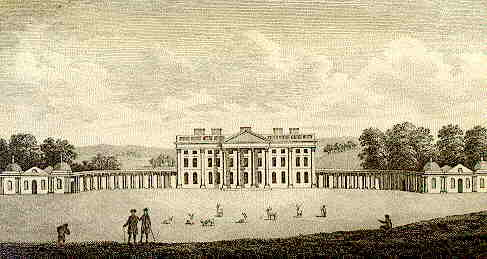
Moor Park during the 1780s when the colonnaded wings were still in situ. Today, the remaining corps de logis is the clubhouse of a golf course.

Leoni designed Moor Park, Hertfordshire, during the 1720s, assisted by the painter Sir James Thornhill. The commission was received from Bengamin Styles, an entrepreneur later to lose his fortune in the South Sea Bubble. Leoni completely redesigned the house, originally built for James Scott, 1st Duke of Monmouth in 1680, giving it a massive Corinthian portico which leads into a vast hall with a painted and gilded ceiling, with a trompe-l'œil dome, painted by Thornhill.

The house was to have similarities with one of Leoni's more ambitious projects, Lathom House. Both were similar in concept to Andrea Palladio's never-built Villa Mocenigo, with great spreading and segmented colonnaded wings embracing a cour d'honneur. Today, the wings have been demolished but the square corps de logis remains.

Lathom House (demolished in 1929) was a truly Palladian house with a large corps de logis, from which spread twin segmented colonnades linking it to two monumental secondary wings of stables and domestic offices. The secondary wings or blocks, each crowned with a cupola, were similar in style to those built by Henry Flitcroft for the Duke of Bedford twenty years later at the far larger Woburn Abbey.

=== Miscellaneous works ===
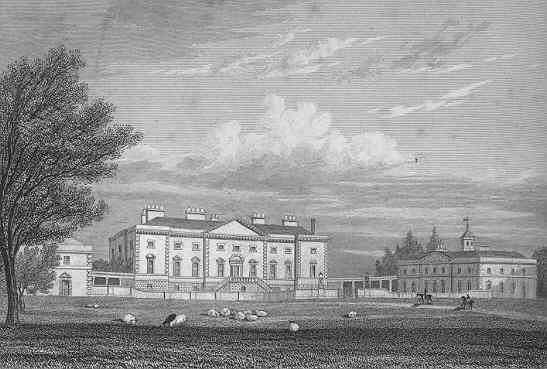
Lathom House, Lancashire. Built in 1724 for Thomas Bootle by Leoni. A Palladian mansion with a rusticated basement and a flight of steps leading to the piano nobile. Linked by colonnades to secondary wings. The house was largely demolished in 1929.

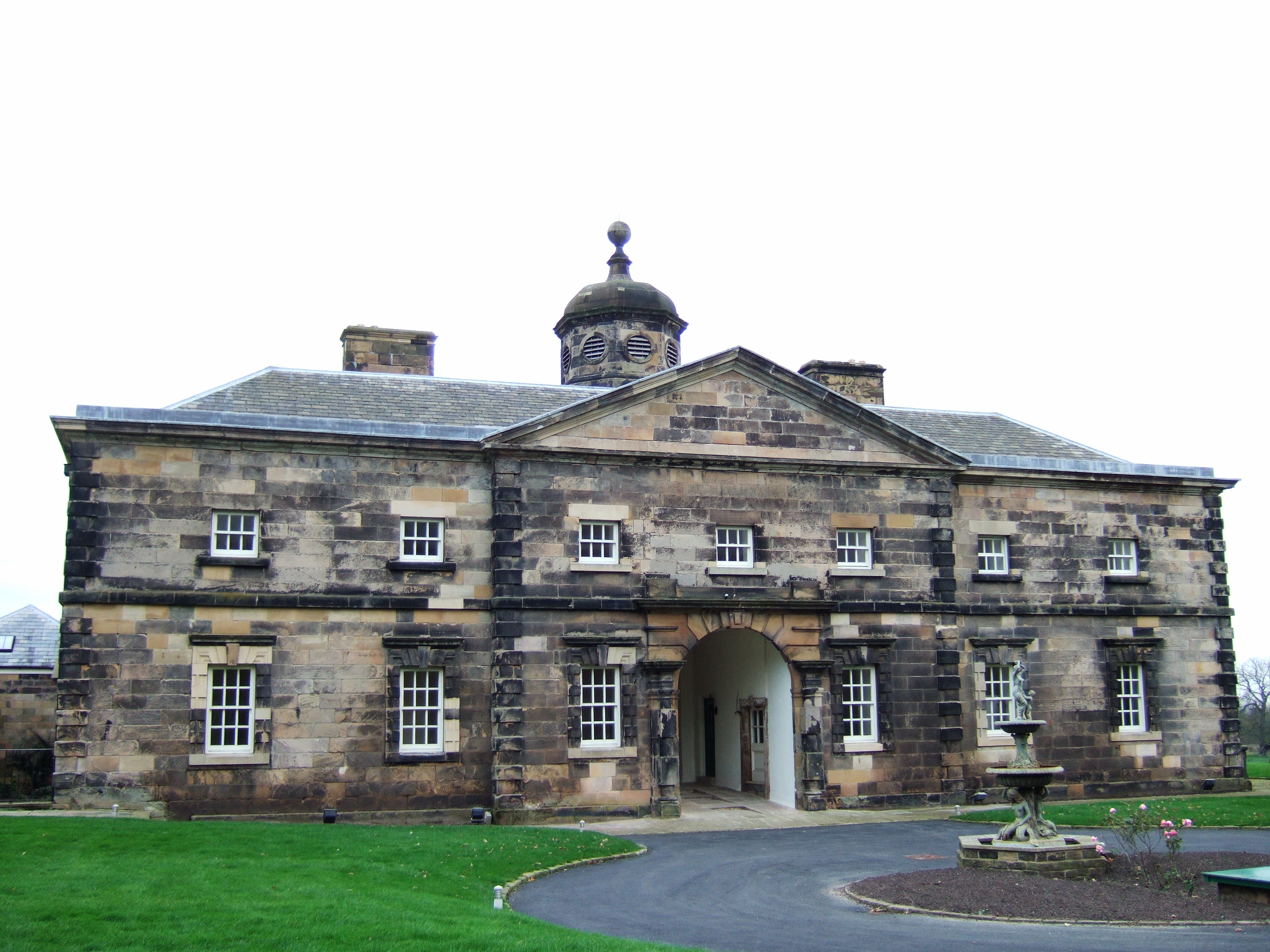
Lathom House, Lancashire, the surviving west wing

However, Leoni's clients were not always satisfied, especially when he designed for clients unaware of the intricacies of Palladian architecture. Leoni had been commissioned by Edward and Caroline Wortley to rebuild the decayed Wortley Hall in South Yorkshire. A magnificent residence arose. However, in 1800, the Wortleys complained they were unable to move in, as the architect had forgotten to build a staircase. One hundred years later, a Duchess of Marlborough made the same complaint against Sir John Vanbrugh's Blenheim Palace. Both owners had rather missed the point of a house built on a 'piano nobile' design. A piano nobile is the principal floor, usually above a lower floor or semi-basement. It contains all the rooms necessary for the grandees who inhabit the house. It usually consists of a central salon or saloon (the grandest room beneath the central pediment); on either side of the saloon (in the wings) there is often a slightly less grand, withdrawing room, and then a principal bedroom. After that perhaps would follow a smaller more intimate room, a "cabinet". The point both the Duchess and owners of Wortley had failed to grasp was that the owners lived in 'state' on the 'piano nobile' and had no need to go upstairs, hence only secondary/back staircases would reach the floors that were occupied by children, servants and less favoured guests. Indeed, these houses often did have a grand staircase, but it was external—the elaborate flights of stone steps to the main entrance on the piano nobile. From photographs of Wortley Hall, one can see the large, tall windows of the 'piano nobile' on the lower floor, and the much smaller windows of the secondary rooms above. It did not require a 'grand' staircase'. Wortley Hall survives today as a hotel; the owners still tell the story of the forgetful architect. Among Leoni’s other designs is Alkrington Hall in Middleton, now in Greater Manchester.

== Influence ==
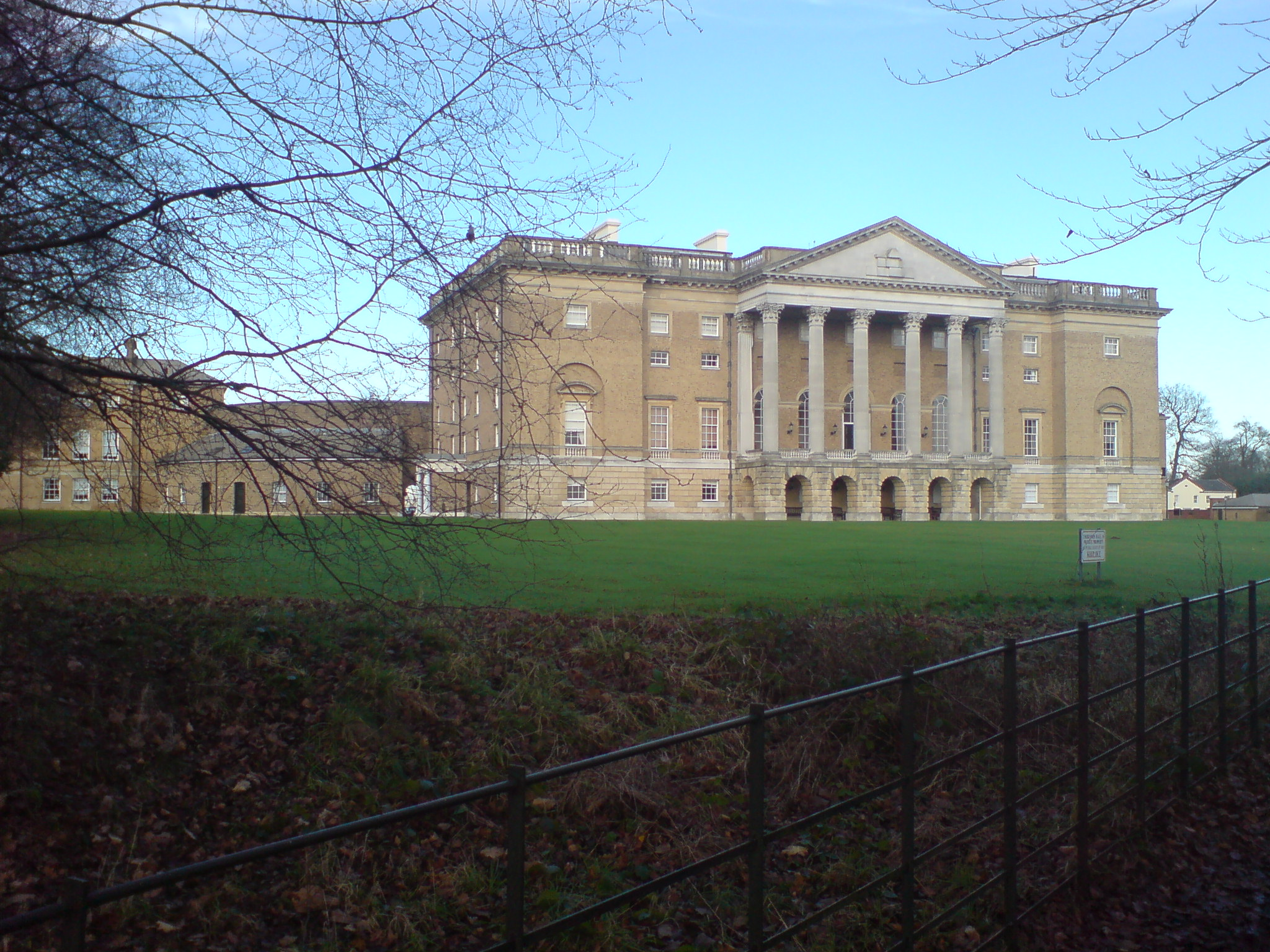
Leoni's portico is all that survived a fire at Thorndon Hall in Essex. The house was rebuilt by James Paine.

Leoni was not the first to import Palladian architecture to England; that accolade belongs firmly to Inigo Jones, who had designed the Palladian Queen's House at Greenwich in 1616 and the more ornate Banqueting House in Whitehall in 1619. Nor was he the only architect practising the concept during Palladianism. William Kent designed Holkham Hall in 1734 in the Palladian manner; Thomas Archer was also a contemporary, although his work tended toward the Baroque style that had been popular in England prior to the Palladian revival. Palladian architecture was able to flourish in England though, as it was suited to the great country houses being built or re-modelled; because unlike the French, the British aristocracy placed primary importance on their country estates.

For all his work and fame, Leoni did not achieve great financial benefit. It is recorded that in 1734, Lord Fitzwalter of Moulsham gave him £25 to ease his "being in distress.". Later, as Leoni lay dying in 1746, Lord Fitzwalter sent him a further £8 "par charité" He is known to have had a wife, Mary, and two sons, one of whom is "thought" to have been a clerk to the great exponent of Palladianism Matthew Brettingham.

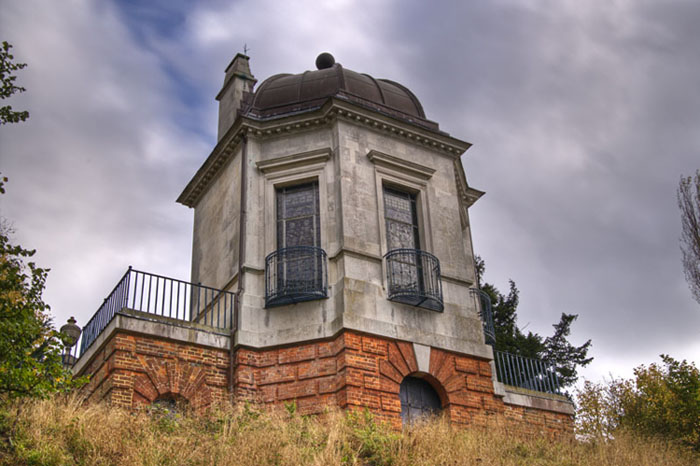
Octagonal Garden Temple, Cliveden by Giacomo Leoni

Leoni did not only design grand mansions. His lesser designs included an octagonal garden temple at Cliveden for George Hamilton, 1st Earl of Orkney, in 1735; an elegant arch in purest Palladian tradition, at Stowe, for Richard Temple, 1st Viscount Cobham; and a Portland stone bridge at Stone Court, Carshalton. Leoni is thought to have designed a new church when working for Robert Petre, 8th Baron Petre at Thorndon Hall, Essex. The original church had been swept away to make room for the new mansion he was designing there.

Today, it is difficult to assess Leoni's works as much has been destroyed. Amongst his country houses, Moulsham, built in 1728, was pulled down in 1816; Bodecton Park, completed in 1738 was razed in 1826 and Lathom, completed circa 1740, was lost like so many other English country houses in the 20th century. By the early 20th century, the style of Palladianism which Leoni's books and works did so much to promote, was so quintessentially English that the fact that it was regarded as purely Italian at the time of its inception was largely forgotten. So indigenous to England does it seem, that in 1913 – a time of huge pride in all things British – Sir Aston Webb's new principal façade at Buckingham Palace strongly resembled Leoni's 'Italian palazzo.'

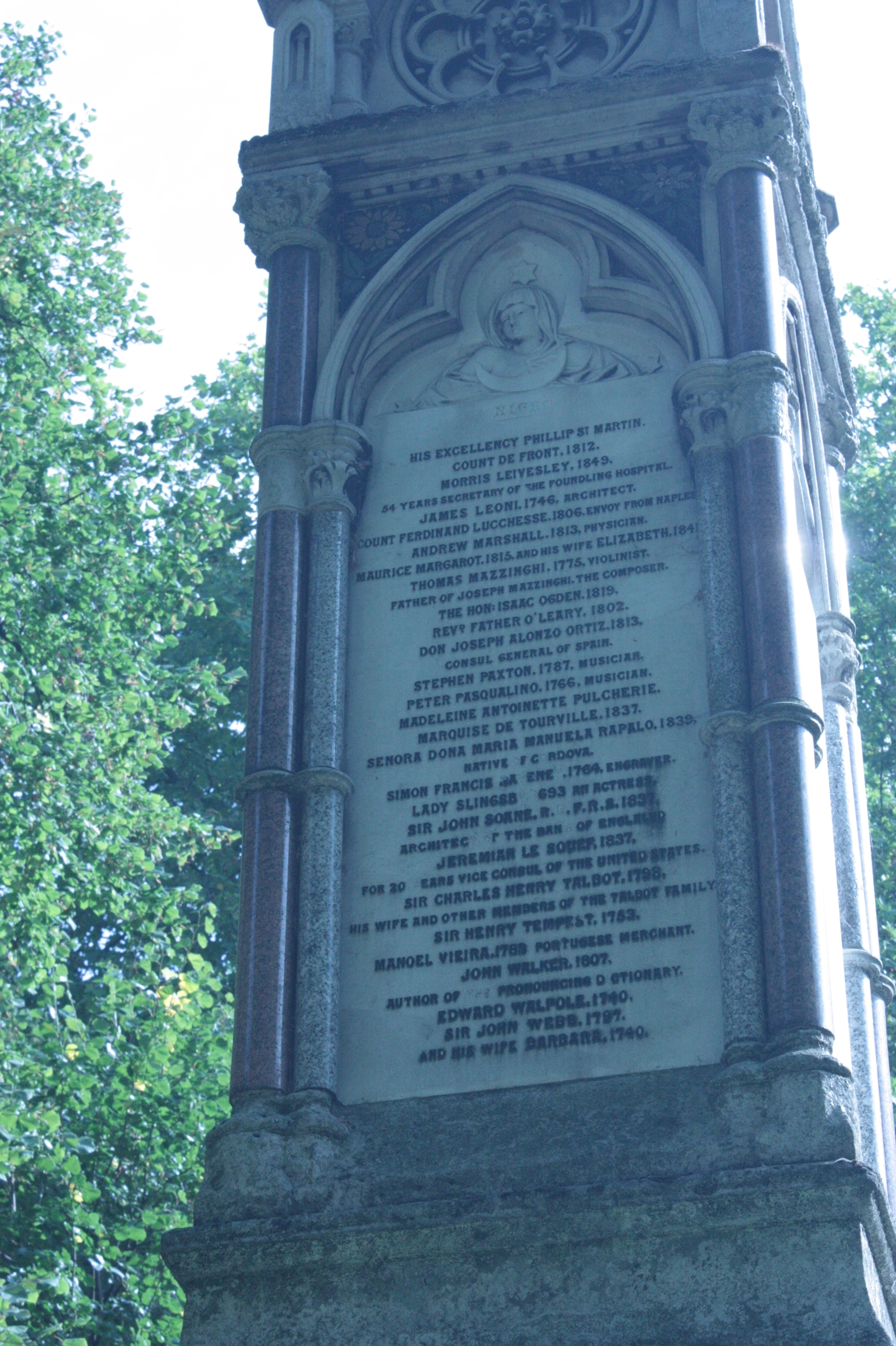
Leoni's name on the Burdett Coutts Memorial, Old St Pancras Churchyard, London (detail)

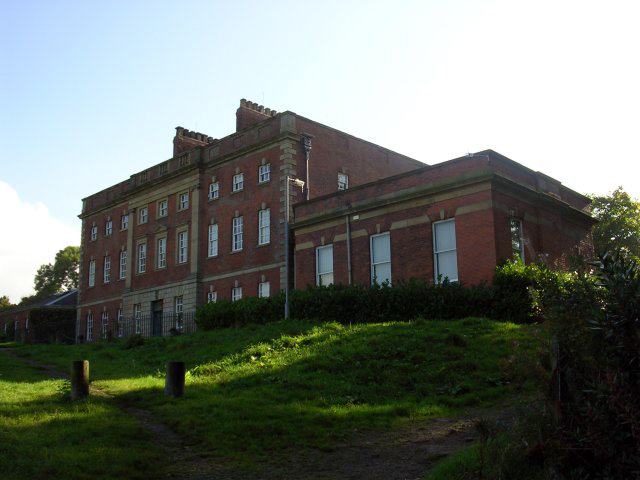
Alkrington Hall in Greater Manchester, built in 1736 for Sir Darcy Lever by Giacomo Leoni

== Death and legacy ==
Giacomo Leoni died in 1746 and was buried in St Pancras Old Church churchyard in London. His name is listed on the Burdett-Coutts Memorial, erected in that churchyard in 1879 by Baroness Burdett Coutts, listing the important graves lost.

By the time of his death, Palladianism had been taken up by a whole new generation of British architects working in the classical forms, and was to remain in fashion until it was replaced by the Neoclassical interpretations of such architects as Robert Adam.

His final intended publication, which would have added to an evaluation of his work "Treatise of Architecture and ye Art of Building Publick and Private Edifices—Containing Several Noblemen's Houses & Country Seats’ was to have been a book of his own designs and interpretations. It remained uncompleted at the time of his death.
