= Richard Westmacott (the elder) =

British monument sculptor

Richard Westmacott (the elder) (1747–1808) was an 18th-century monumental sculptor and the beginning of a dynasty of one of Britain's most important sculpting families. He also specialised in fireplace design for many of England's grand country houses.

== Life ==
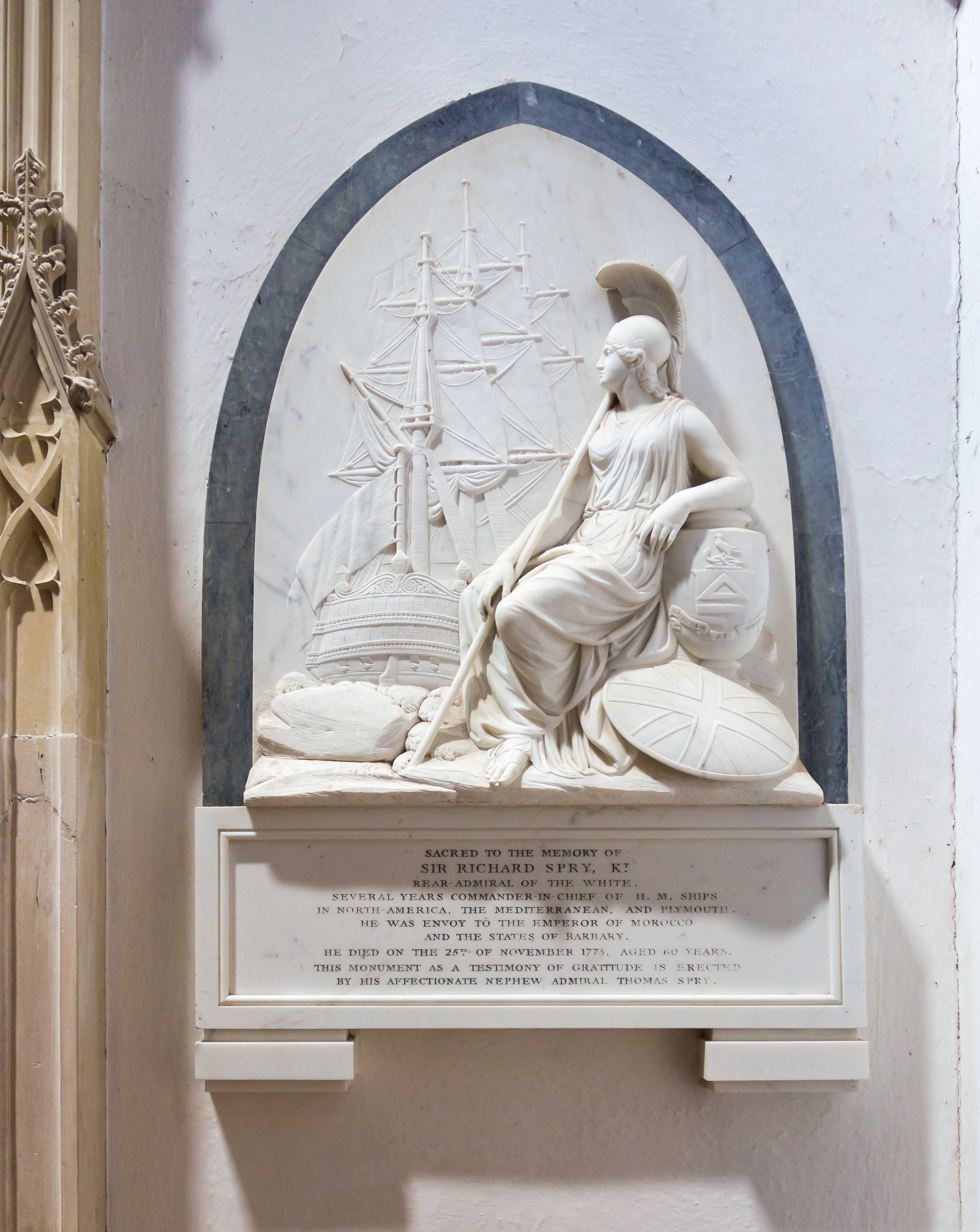
Memorial to Admiral Spry in St Anthony's church in Roseland

He was educated at Brasenose College, Oxford.

He married Sarah Vardy, daughter of Thomas Vardy, carver, and niece of John Vardy, architect, and had thirteen children by her. He also had an affair with a widow, Susan Molloy, landlady of the "Bull and Horns" public house in Fulham and had at least one child by her also.

Westmacott was declared bankrupt in 1803, and was likely supported thereafter by his by then successful son Richard.

He died in relative poverty in 1808.

== Dynasty ==
His sons include: George Westmacott (c. 1770 – 1827); Thomas Westmacott (architect) (c. 1775 – 1798); Sir Richard Westmacott (1775–1856) RA (the most successful and prodigious sculptor of the family); Henry Westmacott (sculptor) (1784–1861); Charles Molloy Westmacott, illegitimate son (1782–1868) (an author who dabbled in sculpture).

His grandsons included: James Sherwood Westmacott (1823–1900) (sculptor); and Richard Westmacott (the younger) (1799–1872) (sculptor).

== Works ==
- Fireplace for the Music Room, Cobham Hall, Kent, 1778
- Monument to Prince Sutton, Devizes, Wiltshire, 1779
- Fireplace for Corsham Court, 1780
- Marble floor, Methuen Chapel, North Wraxall Church, Somerset, 1781
- Monument to Sir Thomas Stapleton, Rotherfield Greys, Oxfordshire, 1781
- Fireplace for State Bedroom, Warwick Castle
- All ornamental fireplaces, New Gorhambury House, Hertfordshire c. 1784
- Several ornate fireplaces for the Admiralty in London, 1788
- Marble fireplace, Woburn Abbey 1790
- Monument to Sir Lister Holte, Aston, Birmingham, 1790
- Monument to Samuel Dennis, St John's College, Oxford, 1795
- Fireplaces and other ornamentation at Kensington Palace, 1796
- Monument to Admiral Richard Spry (1835) in St anthony's on Roseland, Cornwall, c. 1799
