= Charles Molloy Westmacott =

British journalist and author

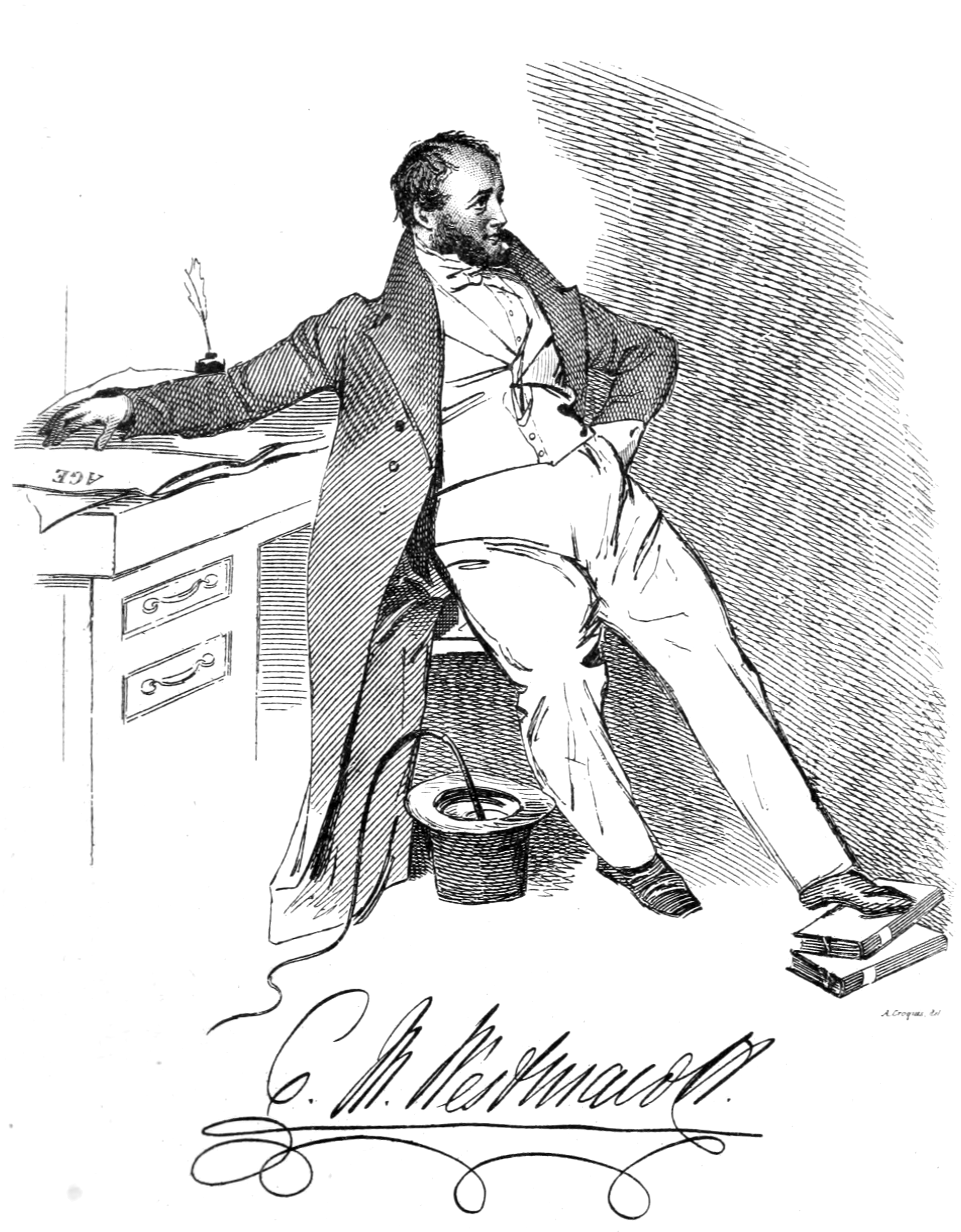
- Charles Molloy Westmacott – The editor of The Age
- Born: c. 1788; London, England
- Died: 1868; Paris, France
- Other names: Bernard Blackmantle
- Education: St Paul's School, London; Oxford University; Royal Academy
- Occupations: Journalist, author, sculptor
- Known for: Editor of The Age
- Notable work: The English Spy

Charles Molloy Westmacott (c. 1788 – 1868) was a British journalist and author, editor of The Age, the leading Sunday newspaper of the early 1830s. He sometimes wrote under the pseudonym Bernard Blackmantle.

== Life ==
Born in 1787 or 1788, Westmacott claimed to be the illegitimate son of the sculptor Richard Westmacott (the elder), although his political enemies claimed he was the son of a chimney sweep from Drury Lane. His mother was Susan Molloy, a husbandless widow, who ran a tavern "The Bull and Horns" in Fulham, London.

He was educated at St Paul's School and Oxford University then went to study sculpture at the Royal Academy. In 1827 he became editor of The Age, a Sunday newspaper which had started in 1825 and which specialized in scurrilous and satirical gossip about celebrities of the day.

Westmacott was savagely portrayed as the unprincipled gossip-monger 'Sneak' in Edward Bulwer's England and the English, and has been dubbed "the principal blackmailing editor of his day". While he did accept money to suppress publication of stories, this was legal until the 1843 Libel Act, and a recent treatment has argued that these practices were "incidental rather than central to the Age."

His best known book was "The English Spy". Because of his connections to the art world the book was illustrated by top artists of the day: Robert Cruikshank and Thomas Rowlandson. He was also the editor of the journal "Records of the Fine Arts".

He exhibited at least one work at the Royal Academy, London: a bust of John Philip Kemble (1822).

In the 1840s Westmacott moved to Paris, where he died in 1868.

A portrait of Westmacott by Daniel Maclise is held by the National Portrait Gallery, London.

== Works ==
- (as Bernard Blackmantle) Fitzalleyne of Berkeley a romance of the present times, 1825
- (as Bernard Blackmantle) The English spy, an original work, characteristic, satirical, and humorous, comprising scenes and sketches in every rank of society... drawn from the life by Bernard Blackmantle, 1825/26. Illustrated by Robert Cruickshank. Republished in 2 vols., 1907.
- The stamp duties: serious considerations on the proposed alteration of the stamp duty on newspapers, 1836
