= 7 Burlington Gardens =

Building in Mayfair, London, England

Coordinates: 51.5102°N 0.1401°W

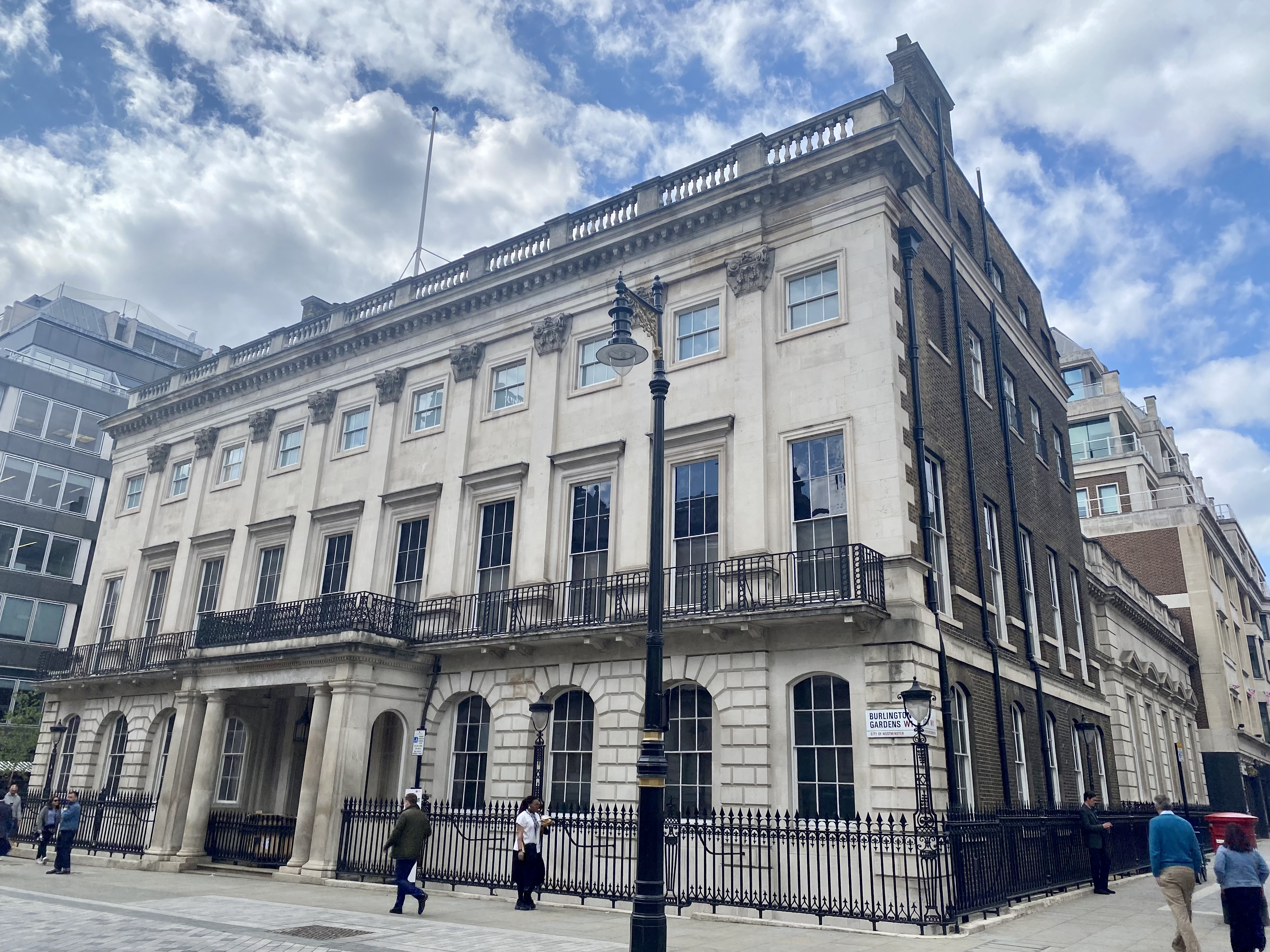
7 Burlington Gardens in May 2022

7 Burlington Gardens is a Grade II* building in Mayfair, London. Formerly known as Queensberry House, it was later called Uxbridge House. The building was a bank for much of the 19th and 20th centuries, and was later for a time home to the London flagship store of the American fashion retailer Abercrombie & Fitch.

== Location ==
The address is in the Mayfair district of London. Although the official address is "7 Burlington Gardens", it is also on Savile Row and Google Maps labels the location as "42 Savile Row, Westminster". On the side of the building facing Savile Row, a sign reads "Savile Row W1". On the facade of the building facing Burlington Gardens, it reads "Burlington Gardens W1".

== History ==
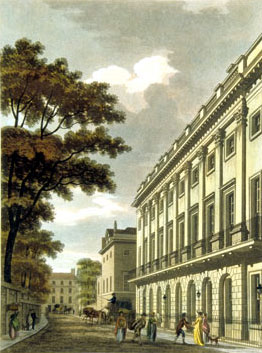
Painting by Thomas Malton, in 1801.

=== Private mansion ===
The building was first erected as a home in the early 1720s. Designed by Giacomo Leoni, the house was initially commissioned by John Bligh M.P., but was sold by him (while the property was still being fitted out) to the 3rd Duke of Queensbury in 1722. As Queensbury House, it remained the Duke's London residence until his death in 1778.

After standing empty for some years, the property was leased in 1785 to the 1st Earl of Uxbridge, who subsequently bought the freehold and renamed it Uxbridge House. He commissioned architect John Vardy to extend the property eastward as far as Savile Row and back along Old Burlington Street. His son the 2nd Earl (created Marquess of Anglesey in 1815) inherited the house; following his death the house was sold in 1854 to the Bank of England.

=== Bank branch ===
The Bank had purchased the house to serve as its Western Branch, providing private and commercial banking services to the residents and retail businesses of London's developing West End. The Bank's architect, Philip C. Hardwick, was commissioned to reconfigure the property to its new purpose. Vaults were created below ground, the old dining room was turned into a banking hall and a new main entrance was inserted into the frontage on Burlington Gardens. The building was further extended behind (over what had been the stable yard of Uxbridge House) in the 1870s.

The Bank of England retained its Western Branch on Burlington Gardens up until 1930, when (having taken a decision to withdraw from the commercial banking sector in order to focus on its role as a central bank) the Bank sold the building (and much of the associated business) to the Royal Bank of Scotland. As the Royal Bank of Scotland Western Branch, the building continued in use as a bank up until the early 21st century.

=== Abercrombie & Fitch ===
Abercrombie & Fitch leased the location in 2005. Overnight in May, a two-story construction wall was erected around the building and was plastered with half-naked men and "Abercrombie & Fitch". The retail space occupies two floors within the building.

Abercrombie & Fitch's presence on Savile Row was initially criticised by the bespoke clothing manufacturers of the street. The Savile Row Bespoke was formed with permission of the City of Westminster to join Row tailors in protecting the image of Savile Row. Mark Henderson, CEO of Gieves & Hawkes was made Chairman and he commented that "Exploiting the Savile Row name to attract high-paying retailers and businesses, at the cost of this world-esteemed industry [Savile Row tailoring], is shortsighted." Another Row tailor, Thomas Mahon, negatively commented on the situation to The Times: "If the Bespoke businesses were driven out by crappy retail stores selling poor-quality clothes ... then Savile Row's name would be irreparably damaged."

In 2020, Abercrombie & Fitch announced it was closing its Savile Row store, along with six other global flagship locations, in response to the global pandemic.

Restoration Hardware RH London officially opened to the public on June 27, 2026. Located at Uxbridge House (No. 7 Burlington Gardens) in Mayfair, the five-floor Palladian mansion features a mix of home furnishings, indoor and rooftop restaurants, multiple bars, and a tea salon.

== Gallery ==
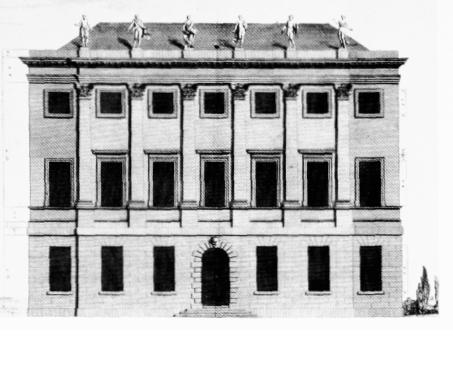
The early years.

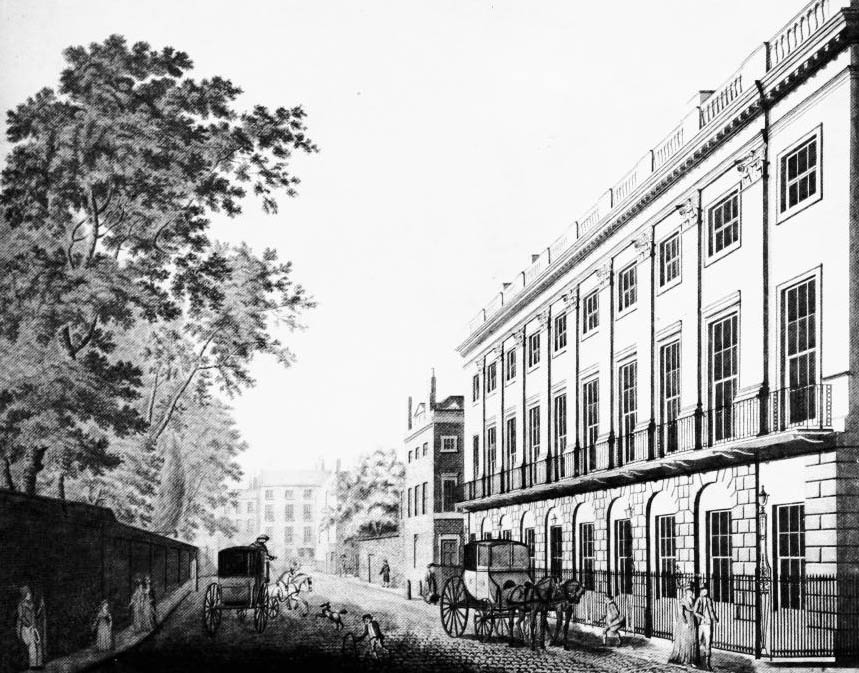
The house in 1790.

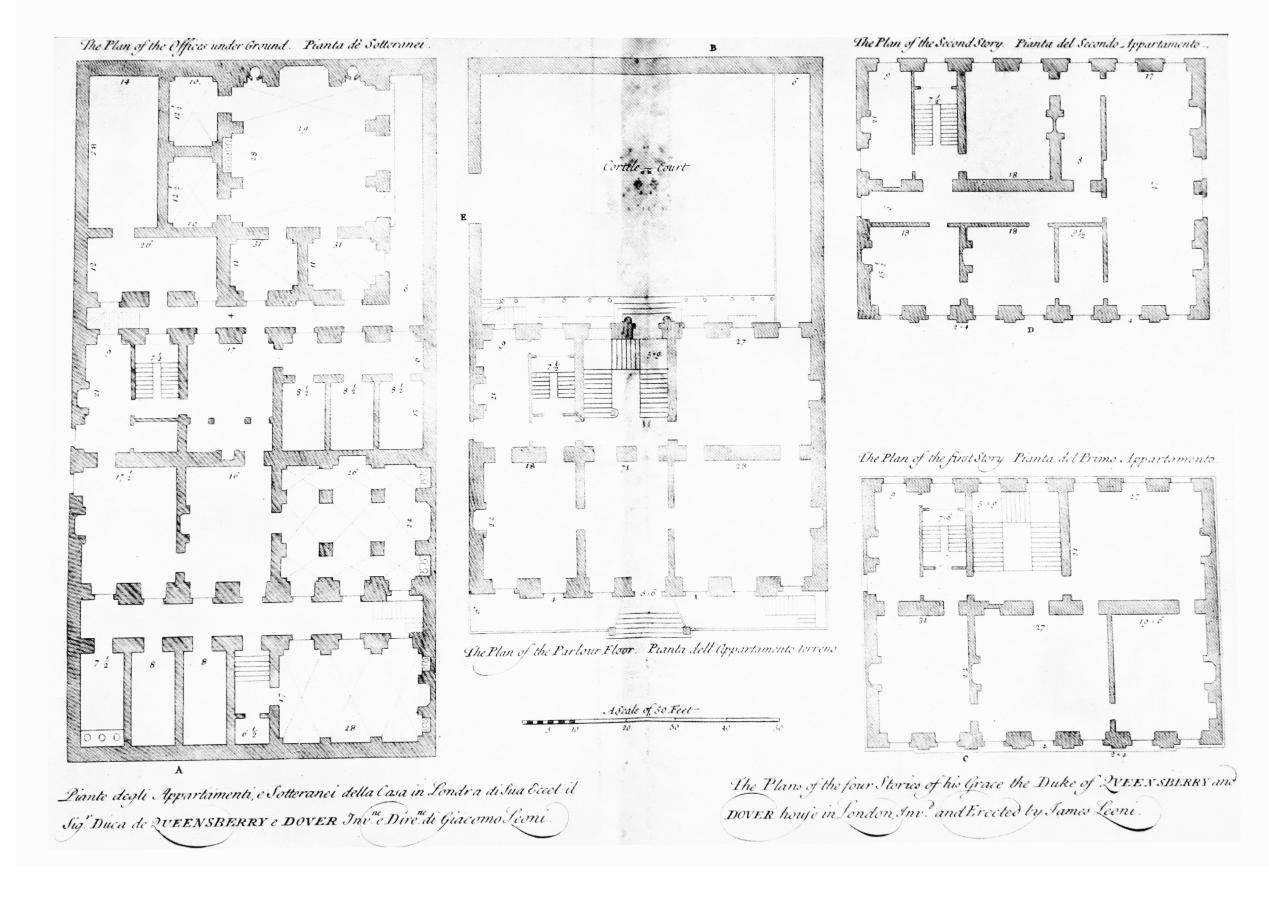
Plans before expansion in the 18th century.

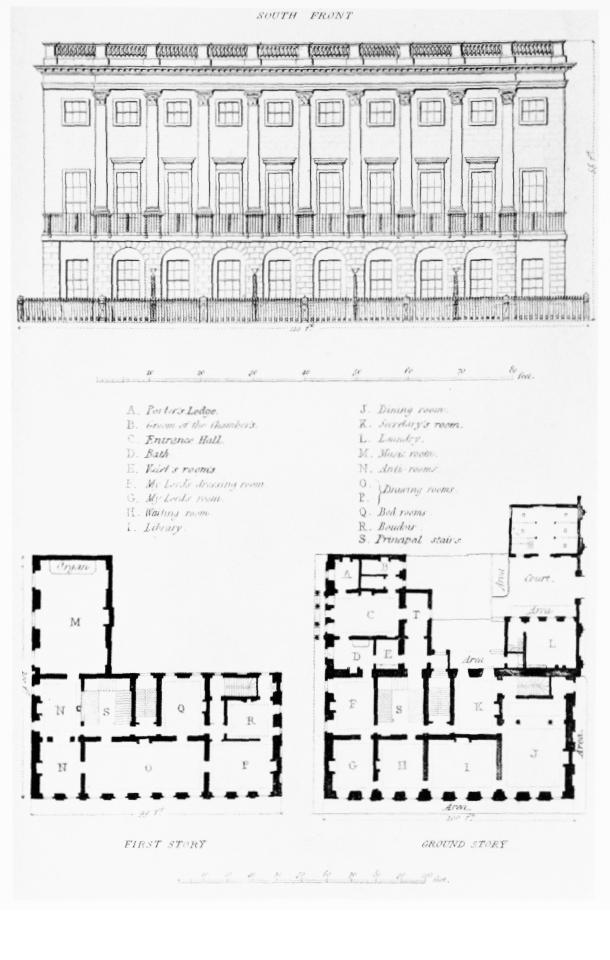
1825 plans.
