= James Pennethorne =

English architect and planner (1801–1871)

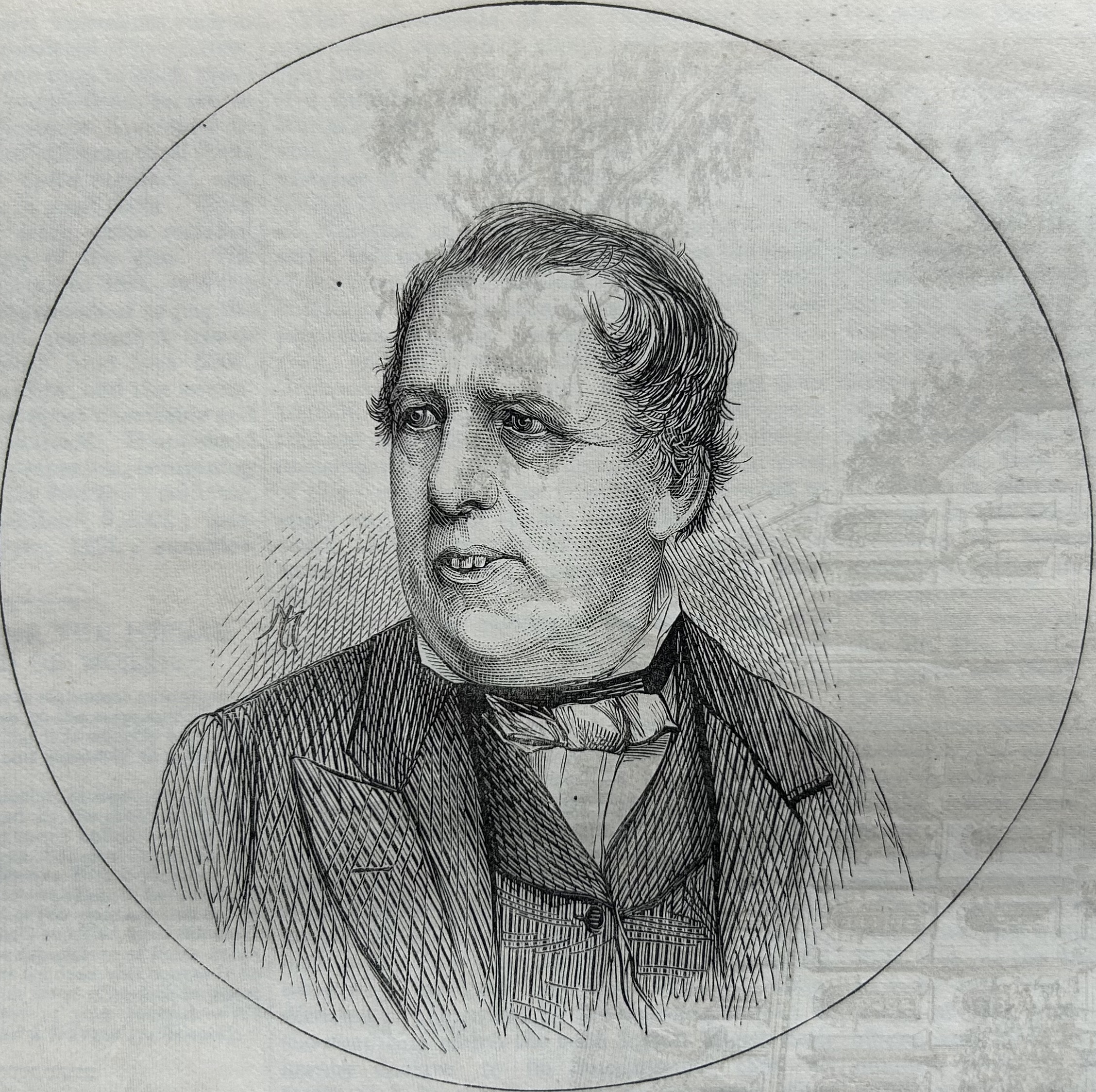
- Born: 4 June 1801; Worcester
- Died: 1 September 1871 (aged 70)
- Resting place: Highgate Cemetery (west side)
- Occupation: Architect

Sir James Pennethorne (4 June 1801 – 1 September 1871) was a British architect and planner, particularly associated with buildings and parks in central London.

== Life ==
=== Early years ===
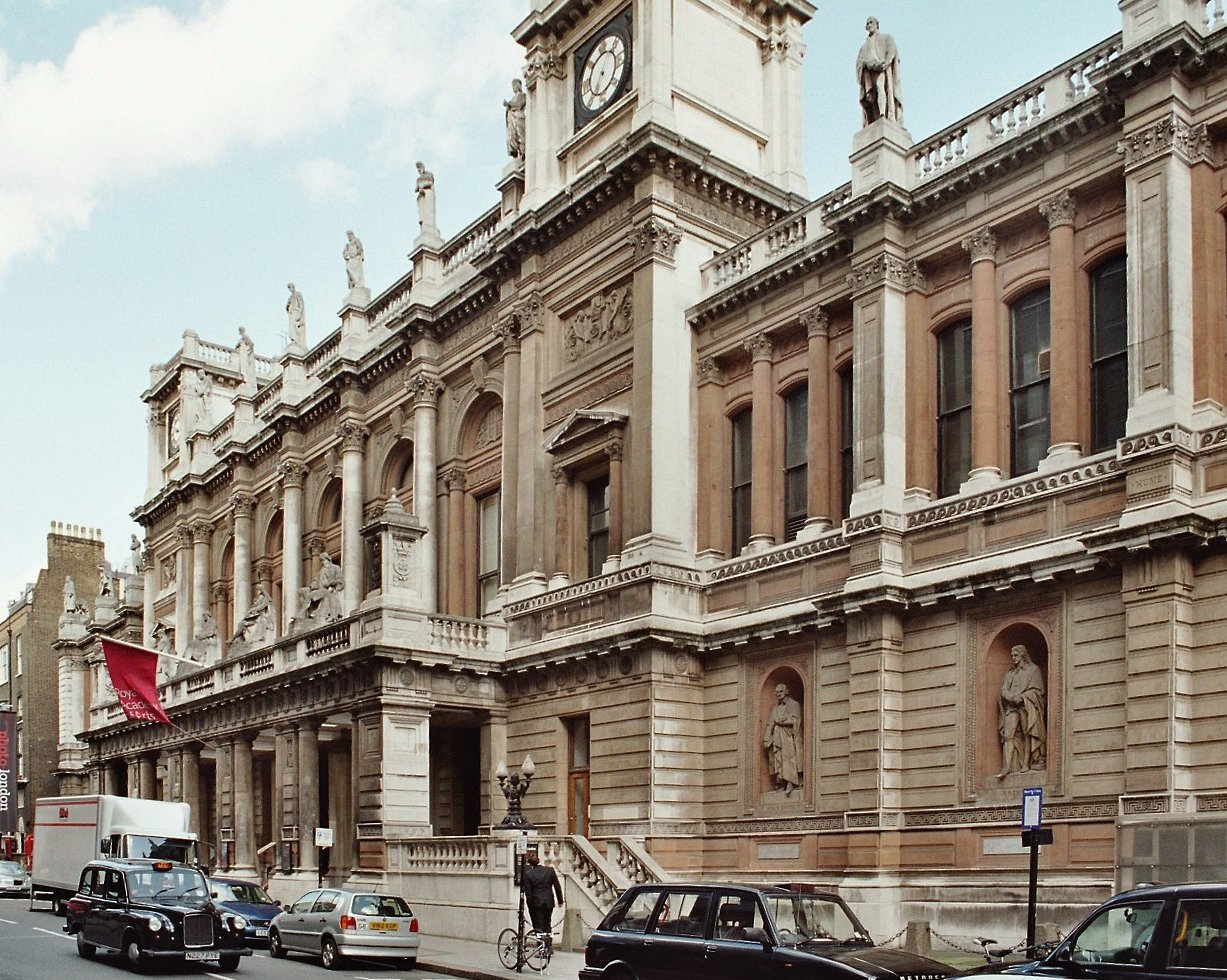
Former Senate House, University of London, 6 Burlington Gardens

Pennethorne was born in Worcester, and travelled to London in 1820 to study architecture, first under Augustus Charles Pugin and then under John Nash. Pennethorne's father, Thomas was a first cousin of Nash's wife.

In October 1824 he set off on a tour of France, Italy, and Sicily. At Rome he studied antiquities, and made a design for the restoration of the Forum, which he subsequently exhibited and was elected a member of the Accademia di San Luca.

On his return to London, at the end of 1826, he entered the office of John Nash, and, as his principal assistant, directed the West Strand, King William Street, and other important improvements, completing the Park Village East and Park Village West in Regent's Park after Nash's death.

Until 1840 Pennethorne engaged in some private practice, his works including the Bazaar, in St. James's Street; Swithland Hall, Leicestershire; Dillington House, Ilminster; St. Julian's (a house at Sevenoaks); and Christ Church, Albany Street. During this time he also began the work for the government, which would come to dominate his career. In 1832 he was directly employed by the Commissioners of Woods and Forests to prepare plans for further improvements in the capital. One of his aims was to form a great street running from the extreme east to the extreme west of London, but this proved too ambitious for the government. However four streets were constructed to modified versions of his plans: New Oxford Street, Endell Street, Cranbourn Street and Commercial Street. In 1846 an act was obtained for the extension of Commercial Street from Spitalfields Church to Shoreditch, but this was not completed until 1858. In 1855 the newly formed Metropolitan Board of Works constructed Garrick Street, Southwark Street, Old Street to Shoreditch, and other thoroughfares from Pennethorne's earlier designs.

=== Public works ===
After 1840 Pennethorne's time was wholly absorbed by his work for the government. In that year he was appointed (with Thomas Chawner) joint surveyor of houses in London, in the land revenue department; in 1843 he became sole surveyor and architect of the Office of Woods, and was appointed a commissioner to inquire into the construction of workhouses in Ireland. The Museum of Practical Geology, which also housed the offices and laboratories of the Geological Survey was built to Pennethorne's designs in 1847–9, on a long, narrow site with frontages in Piccadilly and Jermyn Street. It opened in 1851. In 1847 he drew up designs for the Public Record Office in Fetter Lane. A much modified version of the scheme was adopted in 1850, though only portions of it were ever built. In 1848 he modified Nash's Quadrant in Regent Street, removing the colonnade and inserting a balcony and mezzanine story. In 1852 he worked on improvements to Buckingham Palace and the area between St. James's Park and the Royal Mews. His works at the palace included the ballroom, supper-room, and connecting galleries. To the south of the palace he erected the Duchy of Cornwall office, the district post office, and other buildings. Between 1852 and 1856 he completed the New Wing of William Chambers' Somerset House.

He was responsible for laying out Victoria Park in Tower Hamlets, Battersea Park, and prepared plans and estimates for a proposed "Albert Park" at Islington, which was never carried out.

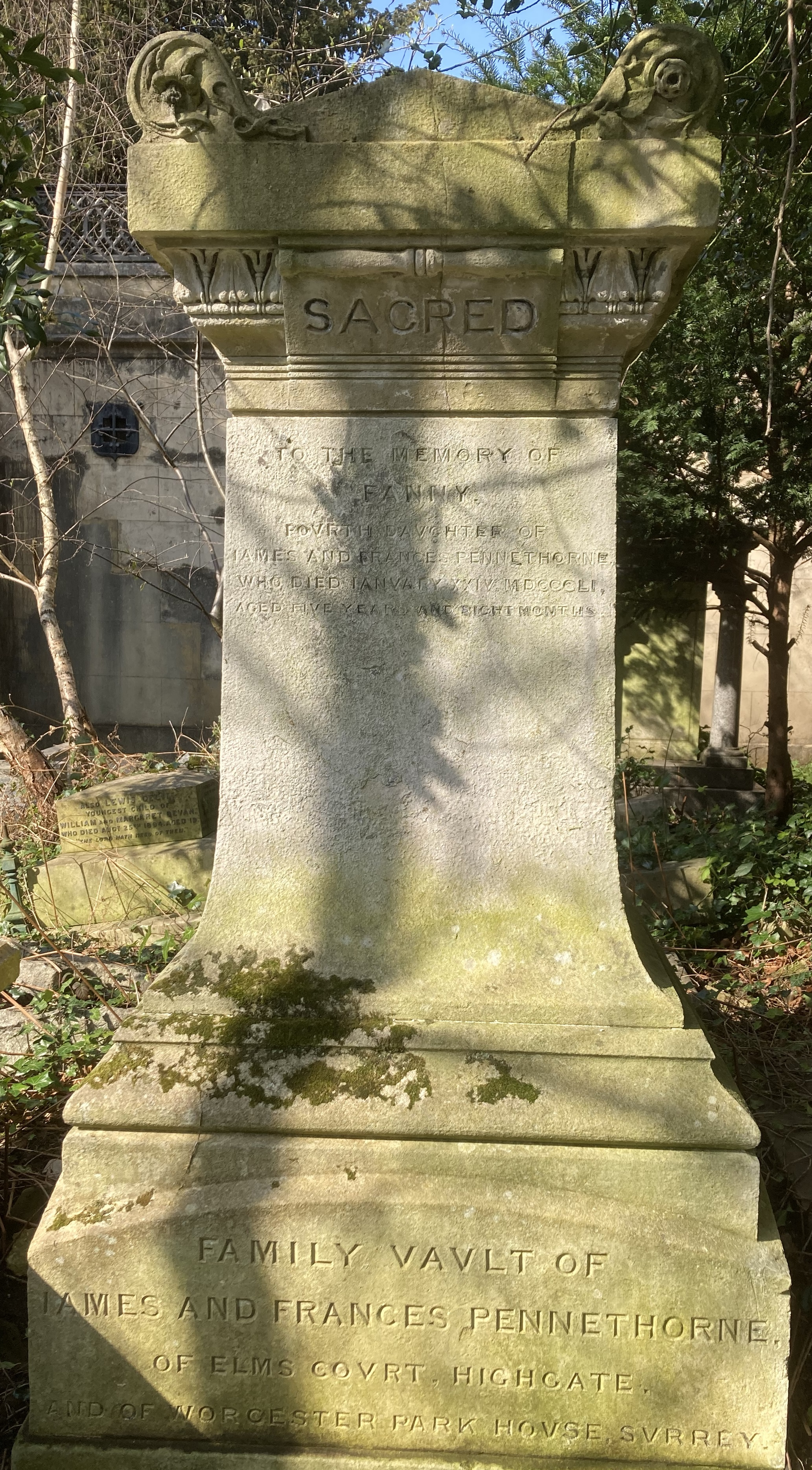
Vault of James Pennethorne in Highgate Cemetery

In 1853 he drew up several different ambitious plans for the laying out of the estate owned by the Commissioners of the 1851 Exhibition at South Kensington, one of which included a relocated National Gallery. In the event the area was developed piecemeal, and Pennethorne's contribution to the scheme, in his role as architect to the Office of Works, was a simple "junction" building containing offices and lecture theatre, linking the new iron museum buildings with existing structures, which had been adapted for use as an art school. He was one of the architects invited, in 1862, to submit designs for a memorial to Albert, Prince Consort, but his suggestion for a monument in the form of a Classical mausoleum was rejected in favour of George Gilbert Scott's Gothic construction. Unbuilt plans commissioned from Pennethorne included designs for new public offices in Downing Street, and a new War Office intended to be built in Pall Mall.

His last work was for the University of London at 6 Burlington Gardens. The adjoining Burlington House, in Piccadilly, had been acquired by the government on his advice, to accommodate the learned societies removed from Somerset House, and the Royal Academy of Arts. The plans for the University of London were approved in 1866, but underwent some modification.

Pennethorne was knighted, in recognition of his public services, in November 1870.

His pupils included Henry Saxon Snell (1830–1904). His brother John Pennethorne (1808–1888) was also an architect.

He died on 1 September 1871 and was buried on the western side of Highgate Cemetery.

== Works ==
In private practice:

- East and West Park Villages, Regent's Park (started by Nash, but completed by Pennethorne after Nash's death in 1835)
- Christ Church, Albany Street (1836)
- The Bazaar, St. James's Street, for William Crockford.
- Trinity Church, Gray's Inn Road. demolished after 1931, site is now Trinity Court, Gray's Inn Road
- Lamorbey Park (enlarged) and Chapel for John Malcolm.
- Swithland Hall, Leicestershire, for Butler Danvers.
- Dillington House, Ilminster, for John Lee Lee.
- St. Julian's, Sevenoaks, for John Charles Herries.
- House at Newmarket, Suffolk for William Crockford.

=== Public Buildings ===
- Museum of Practical Geology, Jermyn Street (1847–49)
- Addition to the Ordnance Office, Pall Mall, (1851)
- Public Record Office, Chancery Lane, London WC2 (1851–1858 – now the Maughan Library of King's College London)

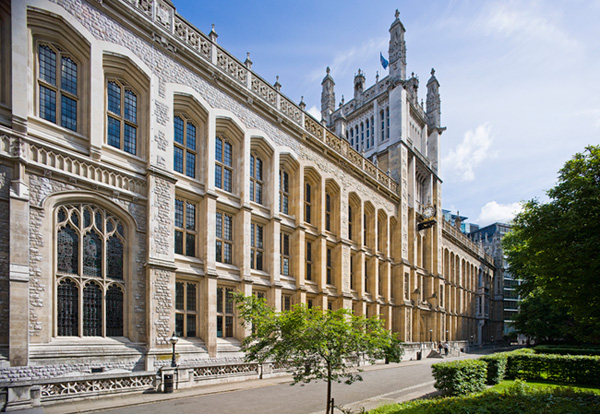
Maughan Library of King's College London (formerly Public Record Office)

- Ballroom at Buckingham Palace, London SW1 (1854)
- Office of the Duchy of Cornwall, Buckingham Gate, Pimlico (1854-55)
- West wing of Somerset House, London WC2 (1849–1856)
- Alterations to the National Gallery, London (1860–1869)
- Army Staff College, at Royal Military College, Sandhurst (1862)
- Alterations to Marlborough House, London SW1 (today the home of the Commonwealth Secretariat) (1863)
- 6 Burlington Gardens, London SW1 (originally designed as office accommodation for the University of London, today this lies to the rear of Burlington House, home of the Royal Academy, which took over 6 Burlington Gardens in about 2005) (1867–1870)

=== Parks ===
- Kennington Park, south London
- Victoria Park, London (from 1842, opened 1846).
- Battersea Park, south London (1846 to 1864, designed with John Gibson)
