= Darren Almond =

English artist

Darren Almond, Fullmoon@Arondine, 2001, lambda print, 48 x 48 inches.

Darren Almond, Mono Chrono Pneumatic Red, 2007, 155 x 291 x 35 inches, installed at the Matthew Marks Gallery for his 2007 solo exhibition.

Darren James Almond (born August 1971, Appley Bridge, Lancashire) is an English artist, based in London. He was nominated for the 2005 Turner Prize.

== Life and career ==
Almond graduated from Winchester School of Art in 1993, with a BA (hons) degree in fine arts. He works in a variety of media including photography and film, which he uses to explore the effects of time on the individual. He uses "sculpture, film and photography to produce work that harnesses the symbolic and emotional potential of objects, places and situations, producing works which have universal as well as personal resonances".

In 1995, Almond had his first solo exhibition in London, showing a single work, KN120, which consisted of a large ceiling fan installed under London's Westway and wired to his studio.

A Real Time Piece (1995), was a live video link that showed his studio, empty but for an industrial flip-clock on the wall that amplified the passing of each minute. Among Almond's other early works is a series of nameplates in cast aluminium, made in imitation of the plaques on British 125 inter-city trains. The film Schwebebahn (1995) features the Sky Train, Wuppertal's public transport system; over three days, Almond journeyed from the beginning of the line to its end and back again, filming inside and outside of the train in one long unedited take.

Since 1998, he has taken a series of photographs on nights with a full moon, using extended exposure times of fifteen minutes or longer. The Fullmoon series began as a way of navigating the places of traditional landscape painters, e.g. with a shot of Mount Saint Victoire in Provence that had been the subject of many of Cézanne's paintings, but has evolved over time to include other remote locations.

For Six Months Later (1999), Almond repeatedly photographed at very precise times an identical location of his studio throughout a set period of time. Each shot features Almond's desk and chair, a window, two fans and a wall mounted flip clock. Each and every photograph is identical with the only variations being the amount of light that permeates the space and the time displayed on the clock. Meantime (2000) comprised a shipping container the artist had transformed into a functioning digital clock and filmed as it traveled across the Atlantic. It has been said to be an atypical performance in a typical sculpture (assisted readymade) in a time-framed installation.

The film installation Mine (2001) was shot in Karaganda, Kazakhstan. In this two-part work, one projection was shot in colour and shows the miners in their locker room changing for work. The camera is stationary and the miners come and go. The second projection shows the view of the tunnel, in black and white, shot from the train that descends into the passages of the mine, in effect what is awaiting the miners when they are finished dressing for work.

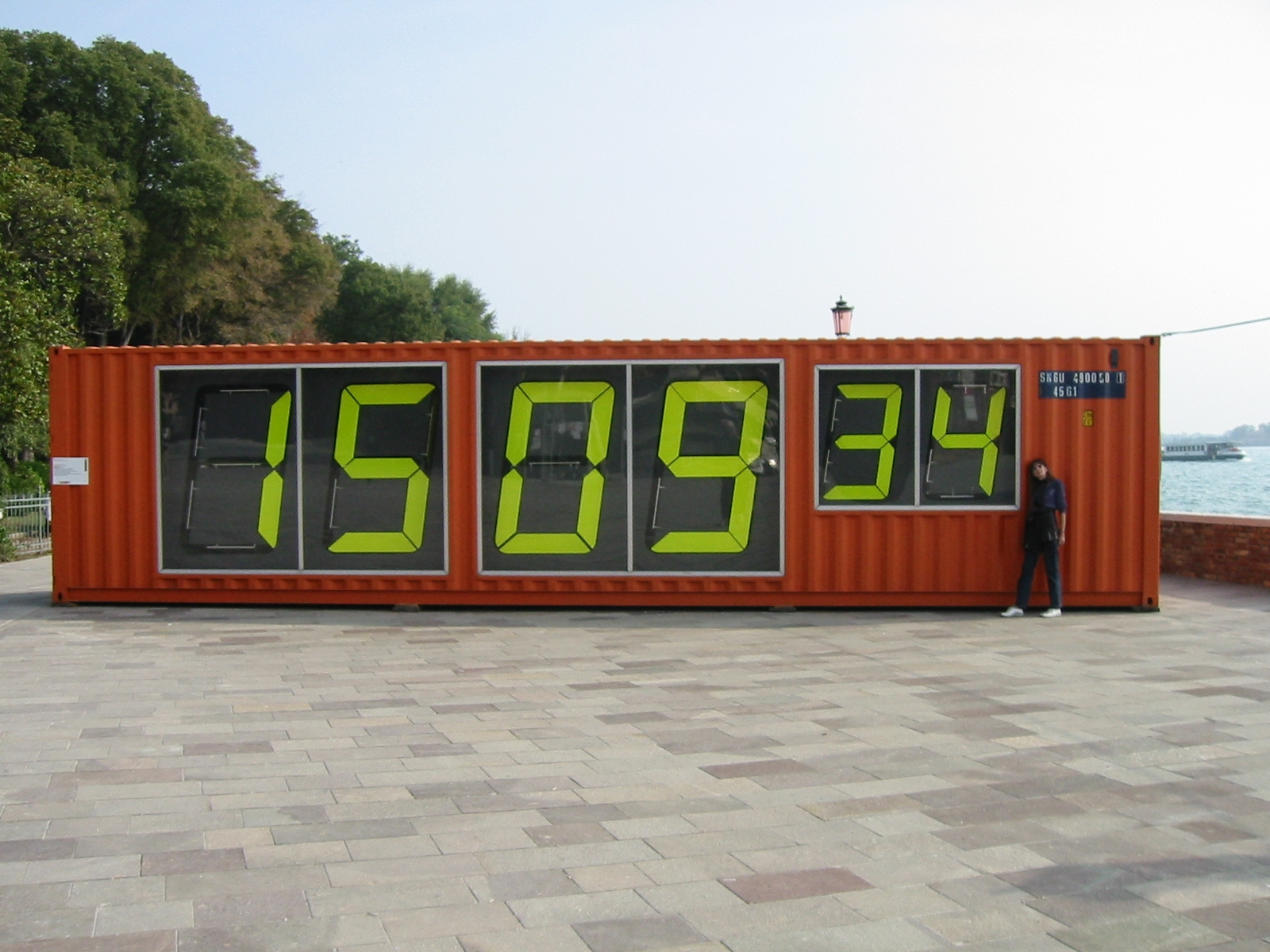
Darren Almond, Meantime, 2000, traveled across the Atlantic Ocean here pictured in Venezia, Italy

His series Infinite Betweens consists of photographs that were taken in Tibet, where traditional prayer flags are hung in trails across the mountain ridges as a way to make offerings of thanks and prayers. The flags accumulate and become scattered over one of the highest and most exposed landscapes on earth. As with the Fullmoon photographs, Almond made use of moonlight and long exposures to shoot Infinite Betweens, preserving the movement of the flags and confronting the viewer with impossible perspectives, different focal points and a feeling of being within the picture.

These photographs developed out of Almond's film In the Between (2006), a 3-channel HD video with audio that examines the new high speed train that connects China with Tibet, a reinforcement of Chinese dominance. The title of these works refers to the Buddhist vision of relativity of all beings and things, the idea that we always occupy an 'in-between' state that is never ending and infinite. In Sometimes Still (2010), Almond follows a Tendai monk as he engages with the Buddhist process of Kaihōgyō, the feat of physical and mental endurance by which these monks attempt to reach a state of Buddhahood.

== Selected exhibitions ==
Almond's first one-person exhibition was in 1995 at Great Western Studios, London. In 1997 he had an exhibition at London's Institute of Contemporary Arts. His subsequent solo exhibitions include those at The Renaissance Society, Chicago (1999); De Appel, Amsterdam, (2001); Kunsthalle Zürich, Switzerland (2001); Tate Britain, London (2001); K21 Düsseldorf, Germany (2005); Museum Folkwang, Essen (2006); SITE Santa Fe, New Mexico (2007); Parasol Unit, London (2008); and Darren Almond: The Principle of Moments, White Cube Gallery, London (2010).

In 1997, aged 26, he was the youngest YBA included in Charles Saatchi's Sensation show where he showed two works, A Bigger Clock and Fan, featuring objects, an oversized wall mountable flip clock and an equally out of proportion ceiling fan. He has also participated in the Berlin Biennale, Germany (2001); Venice Biennale, Italy (2003); Busan Biennale, South Korea (2004); The Turner Prize, Tate Britain, London (2005); Moscow Biennale, Russia (2007); and The Tate Triennial, Tate Britain, London (2009).

== Collections ==
The work of Darren almond is a part of important public and private collections of international contemporary art, such as:

- Museum of Modern Art, New York.
- Musée d'art contemporain de Montréal, Canada.
- Fondation Beyeler, Basel.
- La Colección Jumex, Mexico City.
- Centre national des arts plastiques, Paris.
- Elgiz Museum of Contemporary Art, Istanbul.
- Museum of Contemporary Art, Chicago.
- Art Institute of Chicago, Chicago.
- Tate Gallery, London.
- Metropolitan Museum of Art, New York.
- Saatchi Collection
- Fondazione Sandretto Re Rebaudengo, Turin.
- Rubell Family Collection, Miami.
- Kramlich Collection, San Francisco.
- Fondazione Nicola Trussardi, Milan.

== Awards ==
Notably, Almond was shortlisted for the Turner Prize in 2005, where he exhibited the four-screen video installation If I Had You (2003) about his grandmother – "a portrait of youthful reminiscence and the dignity of old age" In 1996, Almond was awarded the Art & Innovation Prize by the Institute of Contemporary Art, London, followed by his solo exhibition at White Cube, London in 1997.

== Public commissions ==
In 2011, Almond was commissioned with a photographic installation and lightbox panels for the Barts and The London School of Medicine and Dentistry.

== Monographs ==
- Madden, Kathleen. Terminus, Galerie Max Hetzler / White Cube / Holzwarth Publications, 2008
- Weck, Ziba de. Index, Parasol Unit / Koenig Books, London, 2008
- Heynan, Julian. Darren Almond. 50 moons at a time, K21 Kunstsammlung Nordrhein-Westfalen, Verlag der Buchhandlung Walther König, Cologne 2004
- Barnes, Brad. Darren Almond. 11 Miles...From Safety, Jay Jopling / White Cube, London 2003
- Walker, Hamza and Martin Herbert. Darren Almond, Kunsthalle Zürich, Zurich 2001

== Films ==
- This Is Modern Art (presented by Matthew Collins), Oxford Television Company, Production, Channel 4, June–July 1999
