= James Sherwood Westmacott =

British sculptor (1823-1900)

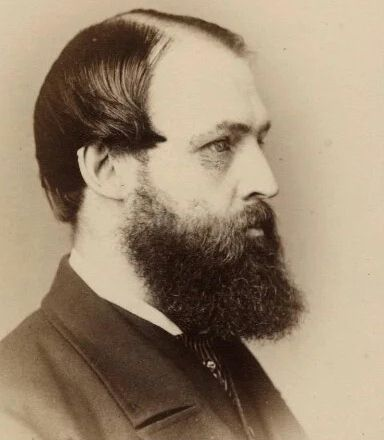
James Sherwood Westmacott

James Sherwood Westmacott (1823–1900) was a British sculptor during the 19th century and part of the Westmacott dynasty stemming from Richard Westmacott (the elder).

== Life ==
Westmacott was born in London on 27 August 1823, the son of Henry Westmacott, a monumental sculptor, in turn the son of Richard Westmacott (the elder).

He studied sculpture under his uncle, Sir Richard Westmacott, rather than his father, Richard being by far the more eminent sculptor.

He made a study trip to Rome in 1849.

He died at Longlands in Chesterfield on 16 August 1900.

== Works ==
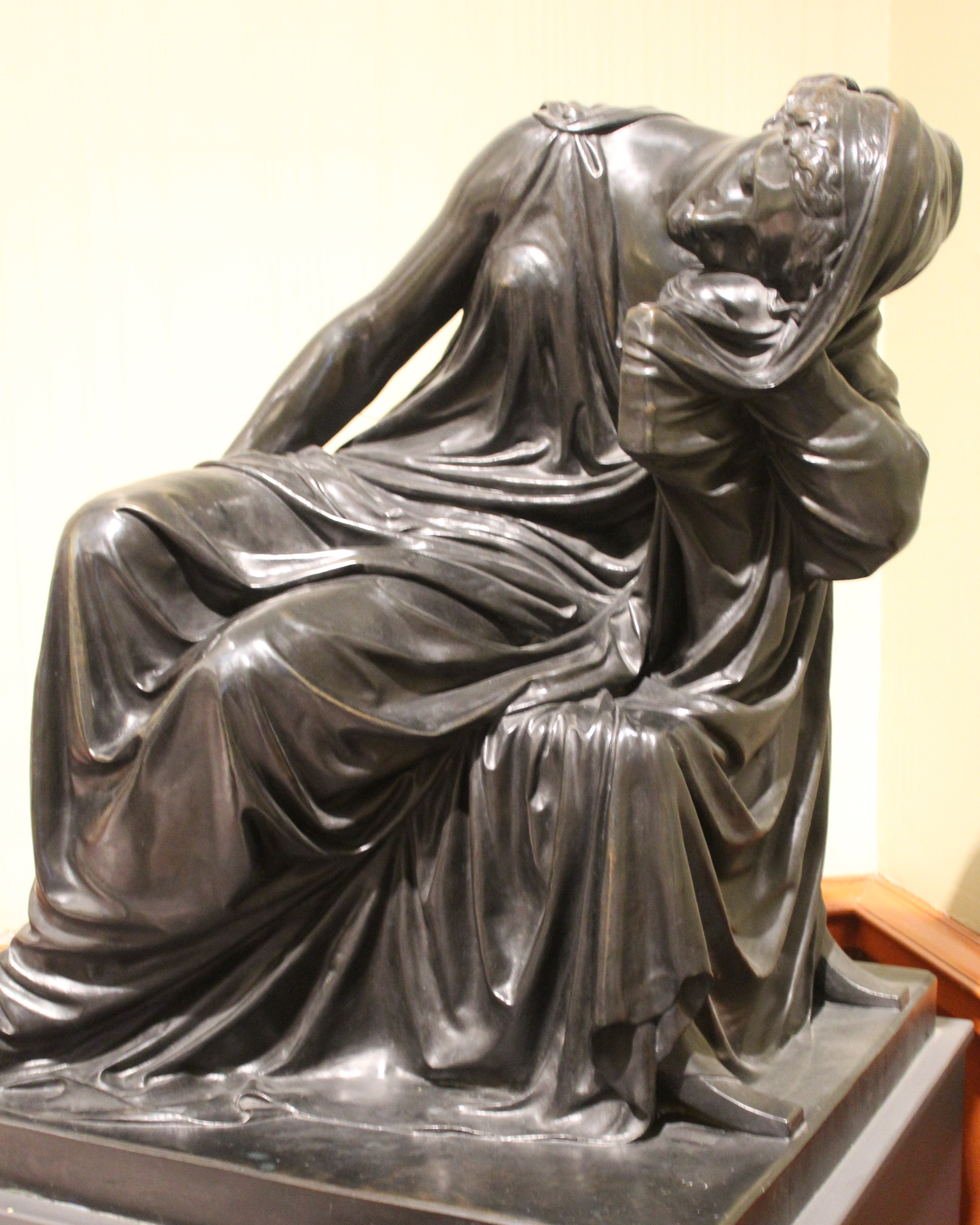
Chryseis, 1867

- Statues "Alfred the Great" and "Richard I planting the Standard", for the Westminster Hall Exhibition, 1844
- Statues of Geoffrey, Earl of Gloucester and Saher, Earl of Winchester, House of Lords, 1848
- Bust of George Barnard, exhibited at the Royal Academy, 1854
- Bust of the Marquess of Anglesey, 1858
- Font, St Mary's Church, Stoke Newington, 1858
- Fountain Nymph, 1861
- Monument to Owen Wethered, father of Thomas Owen Wethered, Marlow, Buckinghamshire, 1862
- Statue of Alexander, the Mansion House, 1863
- Statue of Bomanjee Hormasjee, Bombay, 1865
- Monument to Gilbert East, Hurley, Berkshire, 1866
- Reredos, Little Wolston Church, Buckinghamshire, 1868
- Three figures (Galen, Cicero and Aristotle) for the frontage of the Civil Service Buildings on Burlington Gardens, London, 1869
- Reredos, Newcastle Cathedral, 1870
- Bust of J. Langton Down, 1883

== Exhibitions ==
- Royal Academy, London, 1846–1885
- The Great Exhibition of 1851
- "Peri at the Gates of Paradise", Paris Exhibition of 1855
- The International Exhibition, London, 1862
