= List of statues of Franklin D. Roosevelt =

Image	Statue name	Location	Date	Sculptor	Source
	Allies, Churchill and Roosevelt	New Bond Street, London, England		Lawrence Holofcener	
	Franklin Delano Roosevelt	Rapid City, South Dakota 5th Street & Main Street		Edward E Hlavka	
	Franklin Delano Roosevelt	Grosvenor Square, London, England	1947	William Reid Dick	
	Franklin Delano Roosevelt	Kelvingrove Museum, Glasgow, Scotland	1946	William Reid Dick	
	Franklin Delano Roosevelt Memorial	Washington, D.C. Franklin Delano Roosevelt Memorial	1997	Robert Graham	
	FDR with Fala	Washington, D.C. Franklin Delano Roosevelt Memorial	1997	Robert Graham	
	Statue of Franklin D. Roosevelt	Mexico City, Mexico Calz. Mahatma Gandhi		Jorge de la Peña Beltrán	
	Franklin D. Roosevelt statue	Montevideo, Uruguay Avenue Dr. Américo Ricaldoni			
	Franklin D. Roosevelt statue	Oslo, Norway Akershusstranda			
	Franklin D. Roosevelt statue	Yalta, Crimea			
	Franklin D. Roosevelt statue	Dowdell's Knob, Georgia	2007	Martin Dawe	
	Franklin D. Roosevelt statue-Paseo de los Presidentes	San Juan, Puerto Rico	2008	Salvador Rivera Cardona	Statue of President Roosevelt and his pet dog Fala, unveiled by President Clinton
blue totem pole with brightly colored animal and other figures	Swinomish totem pole	Swinomish Reservation in Skagit County, Washington, United States.	1938	Charlie Edwards	
		New Orleans, Louisiana The National WWII Museum			
	Franklin and Eleanor Roosevelt	Hyde Park, New York Franklin D. Roosevelt Presidential Library and Museum			
	Roosevelt age Twenty-Nine	Hyde Park, New York Home of Franklin D. Roosevelt National Historic Site	1911	PaulTroubetzkoy	
	Franklin Delano Roosevelt	Middelburg, Neatherlands			
	FDR Hope Memorial	New York, New York Roosevelt Island	2021	Meredith Bergmann	
	Strength to our People	Fountain Hills, Arizona Presidents Circle	2016		
		National Harbor, Maryland		Ivan Schwartz	
	President F.D. Roosevelt	West Wyomissing, Pennsylvania			
		Grand Coulee, Washington Franklin D. Roosevelt Lake	1950	Frederic Littman	

== See also ==
- List of memorials to Franklin D. Roosevelt
- Presidential memorials in the United States
