= Roosevelt Memorial =

Roosevelt Memorial may refer to:

- Franklin Delano Roosevelt Memorial, a presidential memorial in Washington, DC
  - List of things named after Franklin D. Roosevelt
  - See Franklin D. Roosevelt#Legacy for other memorials
- Theodore Roosevelt Island, an island and presidential memorial in Washington, DC
  - See Theodore Roosevelt#Memorials and cultural depictions for other memorials

== See also ==
- Presidential memorials in the United States
