= Holofcener =

Holofcener is a surname. Notable people with the surname include:

- Lawrence Holofcener (1926–2017), American-British sculptor, poet, lyricist, playwright, novelist, actor, and director
- Nicole Holofcener (born 1960), American director and screenwriter, daughter of Lawrence
