= Allies (sculpture) =

Sculpture on Bond Street, London

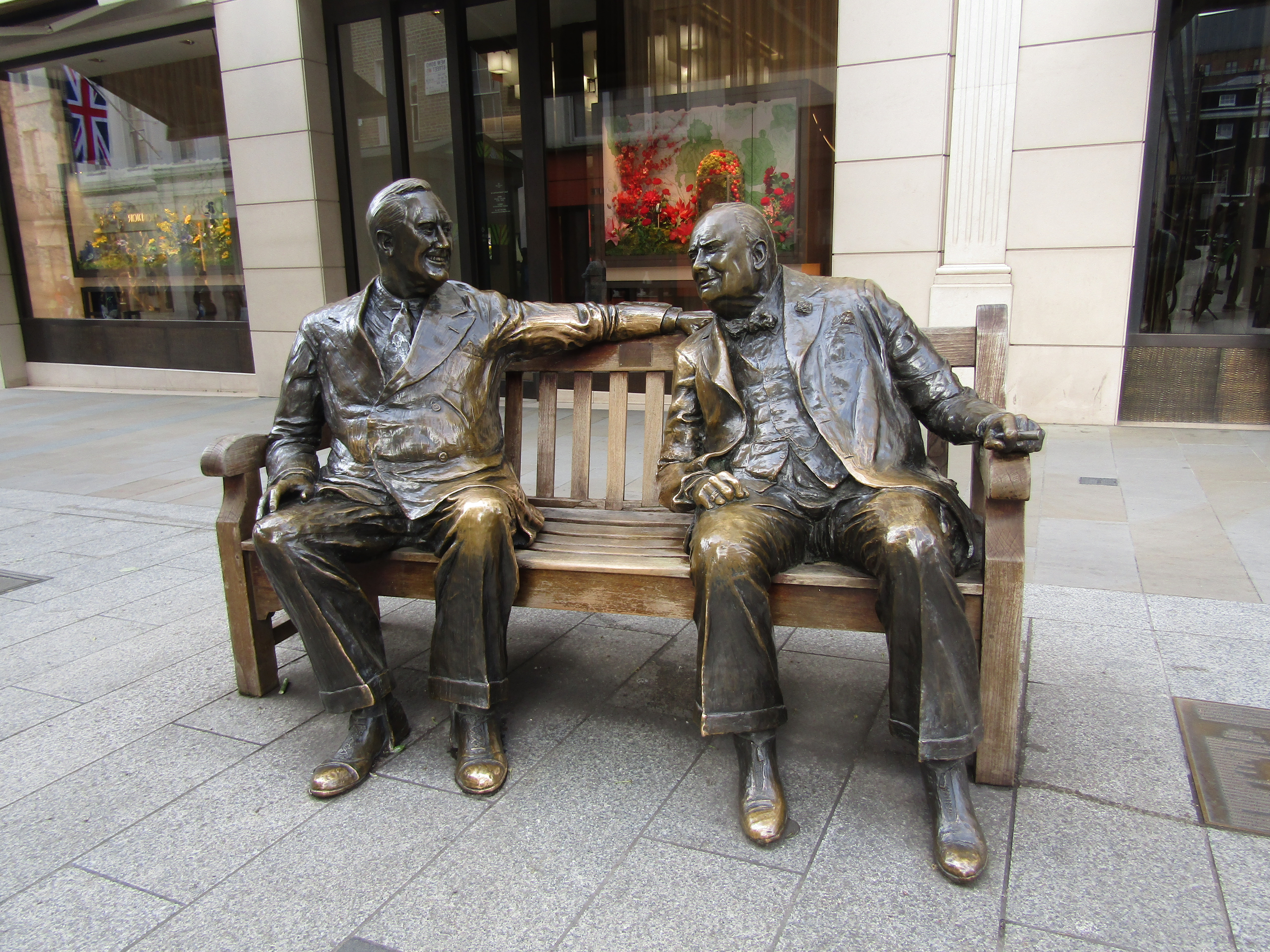
- The sculpture in 2023
- Location: 51.510443°N 0.142505°W

Allies is a sculptural group comprising statues of Winston Churchill and Franklin D. Roosevelt, on Bond Street in London. It was sculpted by Lawrence Holofcener, who holds dual American-British citizenship.

== Background ==
The sculpture of Roosevelt and Churchill was completed in 1990 at Holofcener's own expense. He was unable to find a buyer for the work until it was bought and presented by the Bond Street Association to the City of Westminster in 1995, to commemorate the 50th anniversary of the end of the Second World War.

The statue was unveiled by Princess Margaret, and quickly became one of London's most popular statues among tourists, providing a place to be photographed between the two figures.

=== Maquettes ===
Holofcener would also produce a series of maquettes. Unusually creating them after the unveiling of the original, he studied his own statue on site to make the copies. One example was sold at Bonhams in 2013, and many others were placed in other areas of London.

== See also ==
- Statue of Franklin D. Roosevelt, Grosvenor Square
- List of statues of Franklin D. Roosevelt
- List of memorials of Franklin D. Roosevelt
- List of public art in Mayfair
