= Eagle Squadrons Memorial =

War memorial in London, England

Coordinates: 51.5111°N 0.1512°W

- United Kingdom/United States
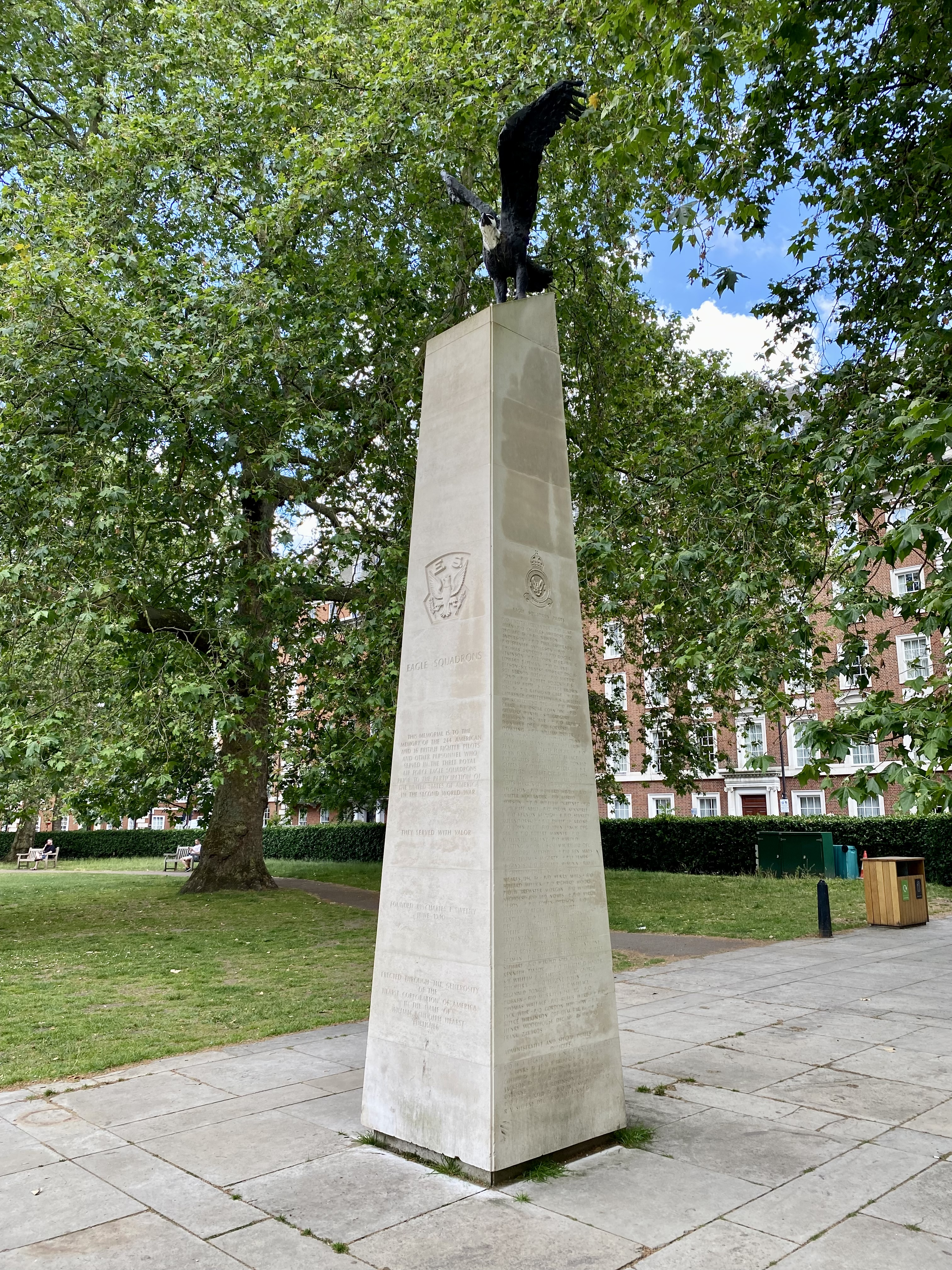
- For military personnel who served in the three RAF Eagle Squadrons prior to the United States' participation in World War II
- Unveiled: 12 May 1986
- Location: Grosvenor Square, London
- Designed by: T. A. Kempster of Trehearne and Norman, Preston & Partners; Elisabeth Frink (bronze sculpture)

Listed Building – Grade II
- Official name: Eagle Squadrons Memorial
- Designated: 19 January 2016
- Reference no.: 1430215

The Eagle Squadrons Memorial is a Second World War memorial in Grosvenor Square, London. It commemorates the service of the three Royal Air Force Eagle Squadrons from 1940 to 1942, during the Battle of Britain, and in particular their 244 Americans and 16 British fighter pilots, of whom 71 were killed. The bronze sculpture of an eagle which tops the memorial is by Elisabeth Frink.

== Background ==
The Eagle Squadrons were RAF fighter squadrons, mostly manned by US citizens who volunteered to serve before Nazi Germany declared war on the US in December 1941. At that time, US citizens were prohibited from serving in the armed forces of a foreign power, on pain of losing their citizenship (although those affected were pardoned by Congress in 1944).

US pilots were recruited to serve in Europe by Charles F. Sweeny from 1939. A unit staffed by US citizens was accepted by the RAF in July 1940, and No. 71 Squadron RAF was formed in September 1940, becoming operational in February 1941. It was followed by No. 121 Squadron RAF in May 1941 and No. 133 Squadron RAF in July 1941, flying initially Hawker Hurricanes and later Supermarine Spitfires. Efforts to recruit US citizens to serve in the RAF continued on a more organised basis under the aegis of the Clayton Knight Committee, which recruited around 7,000 US citizens to serve in the RAF or Royal Canadian Air Force by the time the US joined the war in December 1941, after the Japanese attack on Pearl Harbor.

The three Eagle Squadrons transferred to the United States Army Air Forces in September 1942, becoming 334th, 335th and 336th Fighter Squadrons in the 4th Fighter Group in VIII Fighter Command.

== Memorial ==
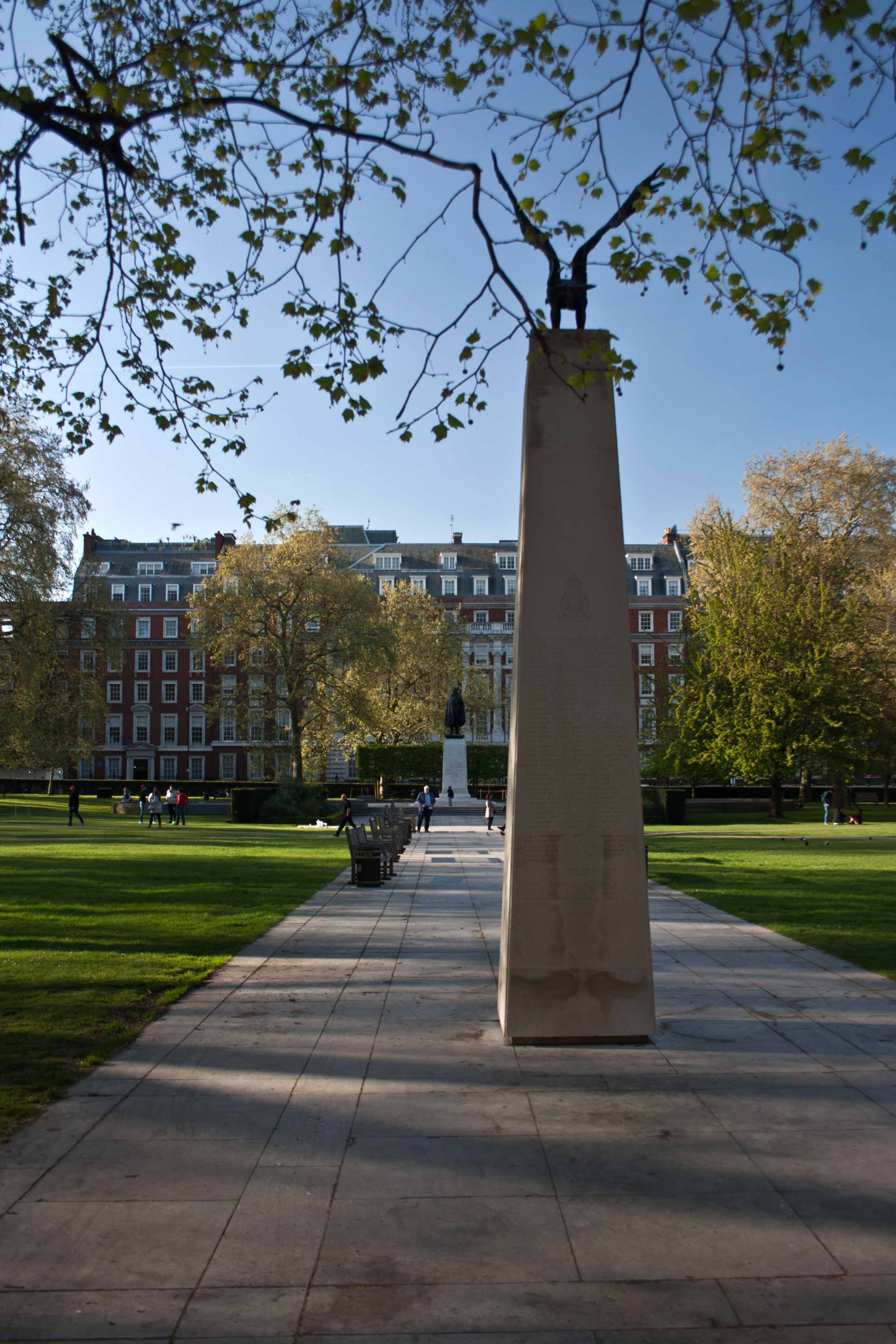
The Eagle Squadrons Memorial faces the statue of Franklin D. Roosevelt in Grosvenor Square (April 2014)

The memorial comprises a tapering 4.6 metres (15 ft)–high obelisk of pale sandstone, topped by a 2.6 metres (8 ft 6 in)–high bronze sculpture of an eagle holding its wings aloft. The head of the eagle is painted white, so that it resembles an American bald eagle. It was commissioned by the American newspaper owner William Randolph Hearst and designed by Tim Kempster, who was also involved in the design of the Fleet Air Arm Memorial. The bronze sculpture is by Elisabeth Frink.

The four sides of the stone column each bear inscriptions. The main side, to the north, has a spread eagle from the Great Seal of the United States, holding arrows in one claw and an olive branch in the other, and an inscription EAGLE SQUADRONS / THIS MEMORIAL IS TO THE / MEMORY OF THE 244 AMERICAN / AND 16 BRITISH FIGHTER PILOTS / AND OTHER PERSONNEL WHO / SERVED IN THE THREE ROYAL / AIR FORCE EAGLE SQUADRONS / PRIOR TO THE PARTICIPATION OF / THE UNITED STATES OF AMERICA IN THE SECOND WORLD WAR / THEY SERVED WITH VALOR / FOUNDED BY CHARLES F SWEENY, JUNE 1940 / ERECTED THROUGH THE GENEROSITY / OF THE / HEARST CORPORATION OF AMERICA / IN THE NAME OF / WILLIAM RANDOLPH HEARST / PUBLISHER.

Each of the three other sides is dedicated to one of the Eagle Squadrons – 133 Squadron, 121 Squadron, or 71 Squadron – with a depiction of each squadron's crest and motto, and a list of those who served: 289 individuals, including 71 war dead.

The memorial was erected in 1985, near the US Embassy in London (which at that time stood on 24 Grosvenor Square), and close to a statue of the US president Franklin D. Roosevelt. It was officially unveiled in May 1986 by the British prime minister Margaret Thatcher. It was listed at Grade II on the National Heritage List for England in 2016. The US Embassy moved to a new building in Nine Elms in 2017, but the memorial has remained in Grosvenor Square.

== Gallery ==
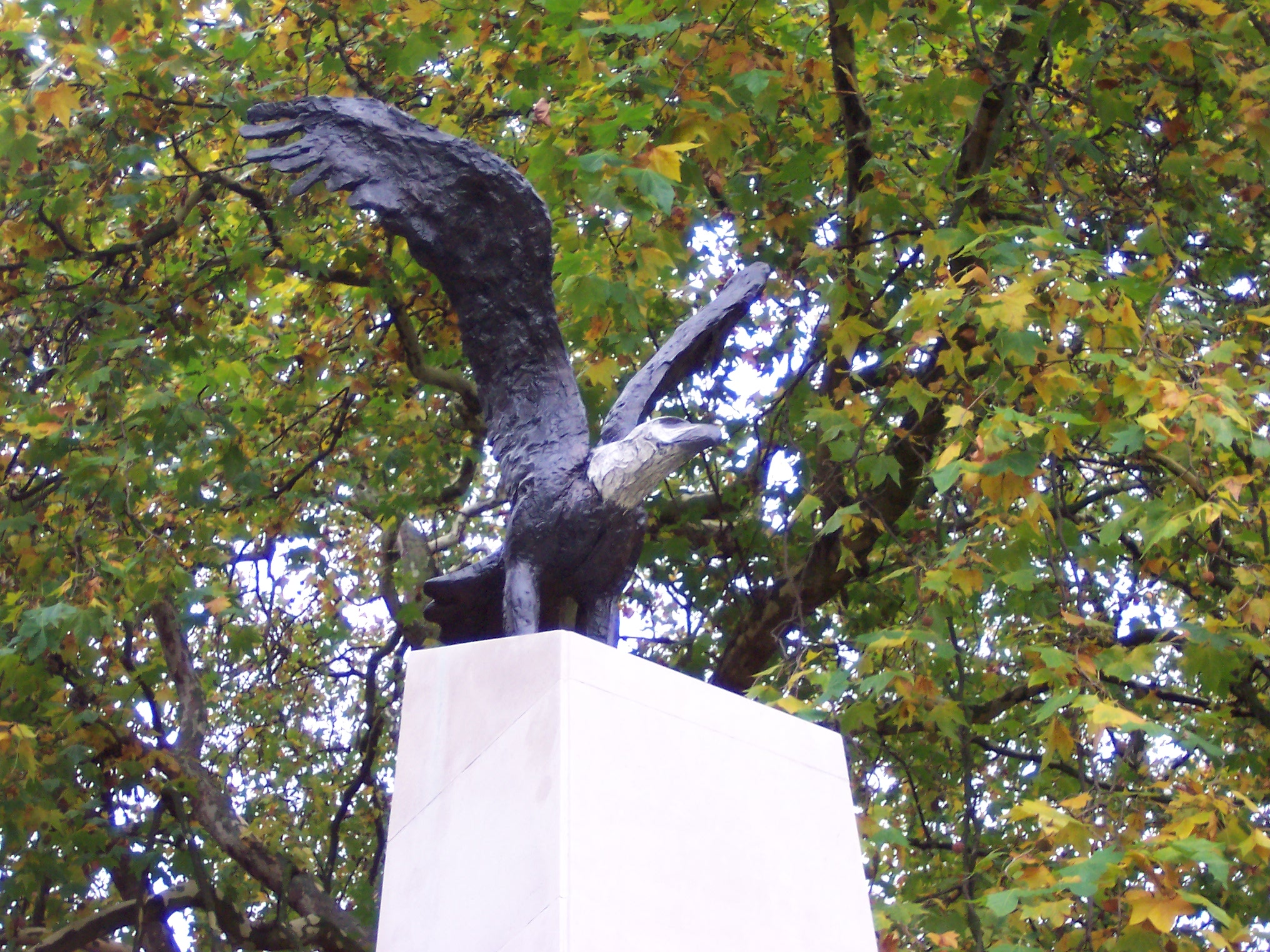
Detail of the bronze eagle

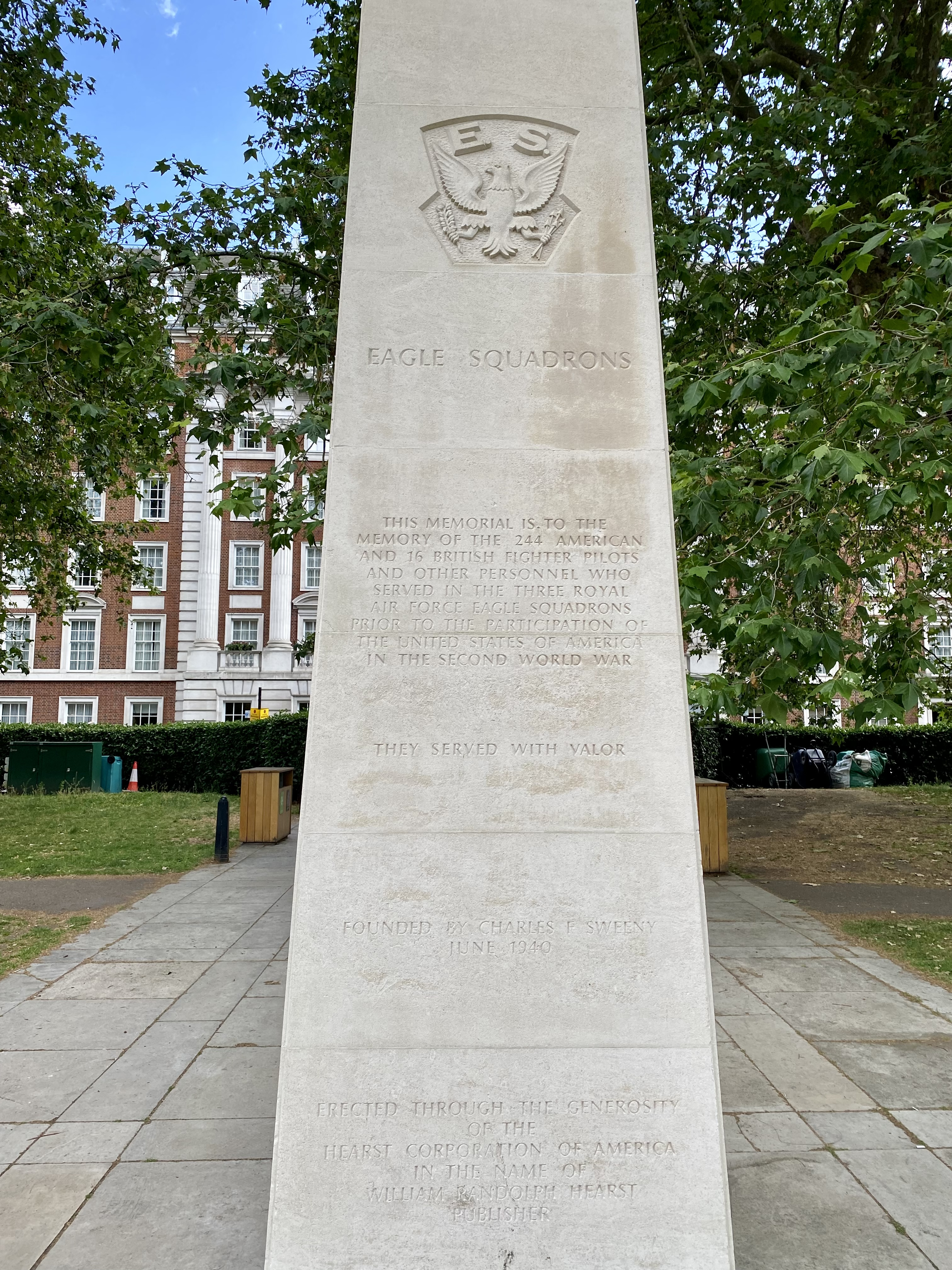
Dedication on the memorial

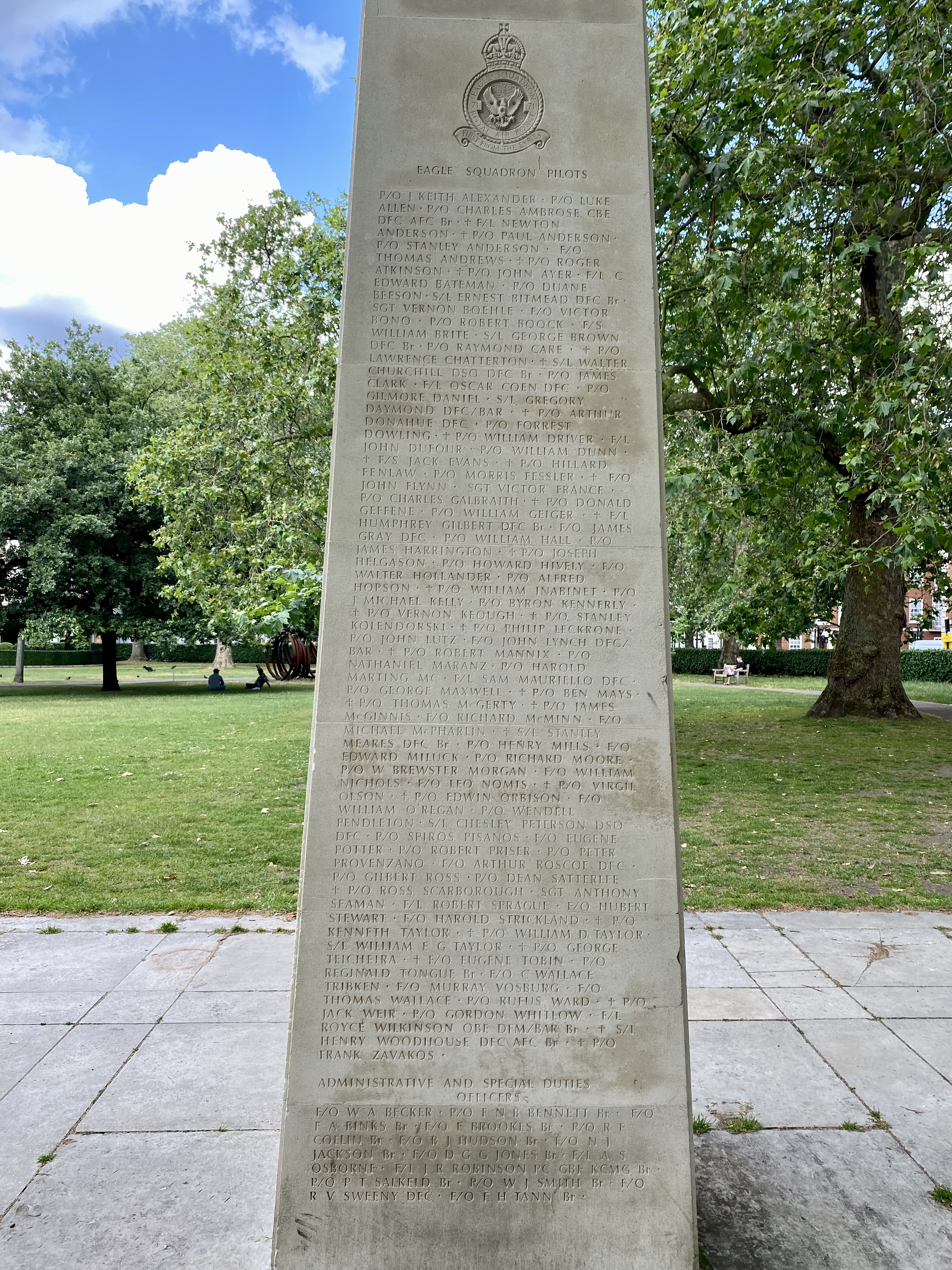
Names inscribed on the memorial

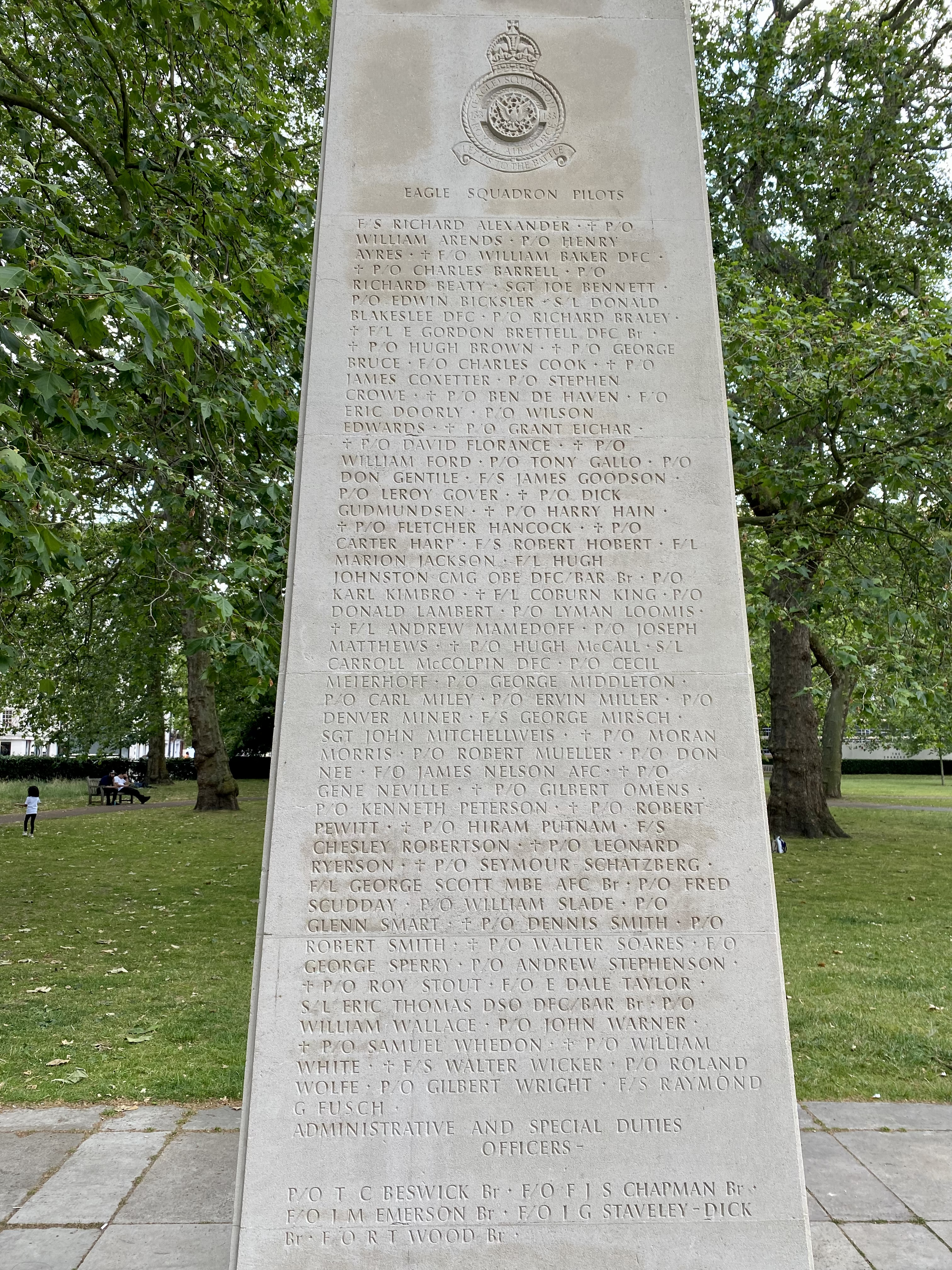
Names inscribed on the memorial
