= Cultural depictions of Franklin D. Roosevelt =

Franklin D. Roosevelt, the 32nd President of the United States, has inspired or been portrayed in numerous cultural works.

== Fictional literature ==
- The Golden Age, a 2000 novel by Gore Vidal
- Southern Victory series by Harry Turtledove
- The War That Came Early series by Harry Turtledove
- Worldwar series by Harry Turtledove
- Joe Steele by Harry Turtledove
- Days of Infamy series by Harry Turtledove
- Or Even Eagle Flew by Harry Turtledove
- The Plot Against America (2004) novel by Philip Roth
- Axis of Time series by John Birmingham
- The Proteus Operation by James P. Hogan
- Hitler's Peace by Philip Kerr
- The Man in the High Castle by Philip K. Dick
- SS-GB by Len Deighton
- 1945 by Newt Gingrich and William R. Forstchen
- Pacific War series by Newt Gingrich and William R. Forstchen
- The Shape of Things to Come by H.G. Wells

== Film ==
- Yankee Doodle Dandy, a 1942 film
- This is the Army, a 1943 film
- Mission to Moscow, a 1943 film
- The Beginning or the End, a 1947 docudrama
- Beau James, a 1957 film
- Sunrise at Campobello, a 1960 film based on the play of the same name
- The Private Files of J. Edgar Hoover, a 1977 film
- Annie, a 1982 adaptation of the musical of the same name
- Pearl Harbor, a 2001 film
- FDR: American Badass!, a 2012 film
- Hyde Park on Hudson, a 2012 film
- The Monuments Men, a 2014 film
- Darkest Hour, a 2017 film
- Justice Society: World War II, a 2021 film
- The Six Triple Eight, a 2024 film

== Television ==
- Eleanor and Franklin, a 1976 television miniseries
- Eleanor and Franklin: The White House Years, a 1977 television film
- The Winds of War, a 1983 miniseries
- War and Remembrance, a 1989 miniseries and sequel to The Winds of War
- The Kennedys of Massachusetts, a 1990 television film
- Konpeki no Kantai a 1990-1996 animated television series
- World War II: When Lions Roared, 1994 biographical miniseries
- Truman, a 1995 television film
- Winchell, a 1998 television film
- Annie, a 1999 television movie adaptation of the musical of the same name
- Warm Springs, a 2005 television film
- Into the Storm, a 2009 television film
- All the Presidents' Heads, a 2011 episode of the television series Futurama
- The World Wars, a 2014 documentary miniseries
- The Roosevelts, a 2014 documentary miniseries depicting the Roosevelt family
- Atlantic Crossing, 2020 television series
- The New Deal (Agents of S.H.I.E.L.D.), a 2020 episode of the television series Agents of S.H.I.E.L.D.
- The First Lady, a 2022 television series
- FDR, a 2023 documentary miniseries

== Theatrical productions ==
- Annie, a 1976 musical
- I'd Rather Be Right, a 1937 musical
- Sunrise at Campobello, a 1958 play

== Video games ==
- Civilization, a series of turn-based strategy games
- Hearts of Iron, a series of grand strategy games depicting World War II
- The Political Machine, a series of presidential campaign simulation games

== Other works ==
- Ace Kilroy, a webcomic

== Other depictions ==
- Presidential $1 Coin Program
- Roosevelt dime
- He is the subject of the song, "Papa Roosevelt," a song in Spanish by the Puerto Rican group, Los Jardineros, which can be found on YouTube.

== See also ==
- List of memorials to Franklin D. Roosevelt
