= Statue of Franklin D. Roosevelt (Mexico City) =

Statue in Mexico City, Mexico

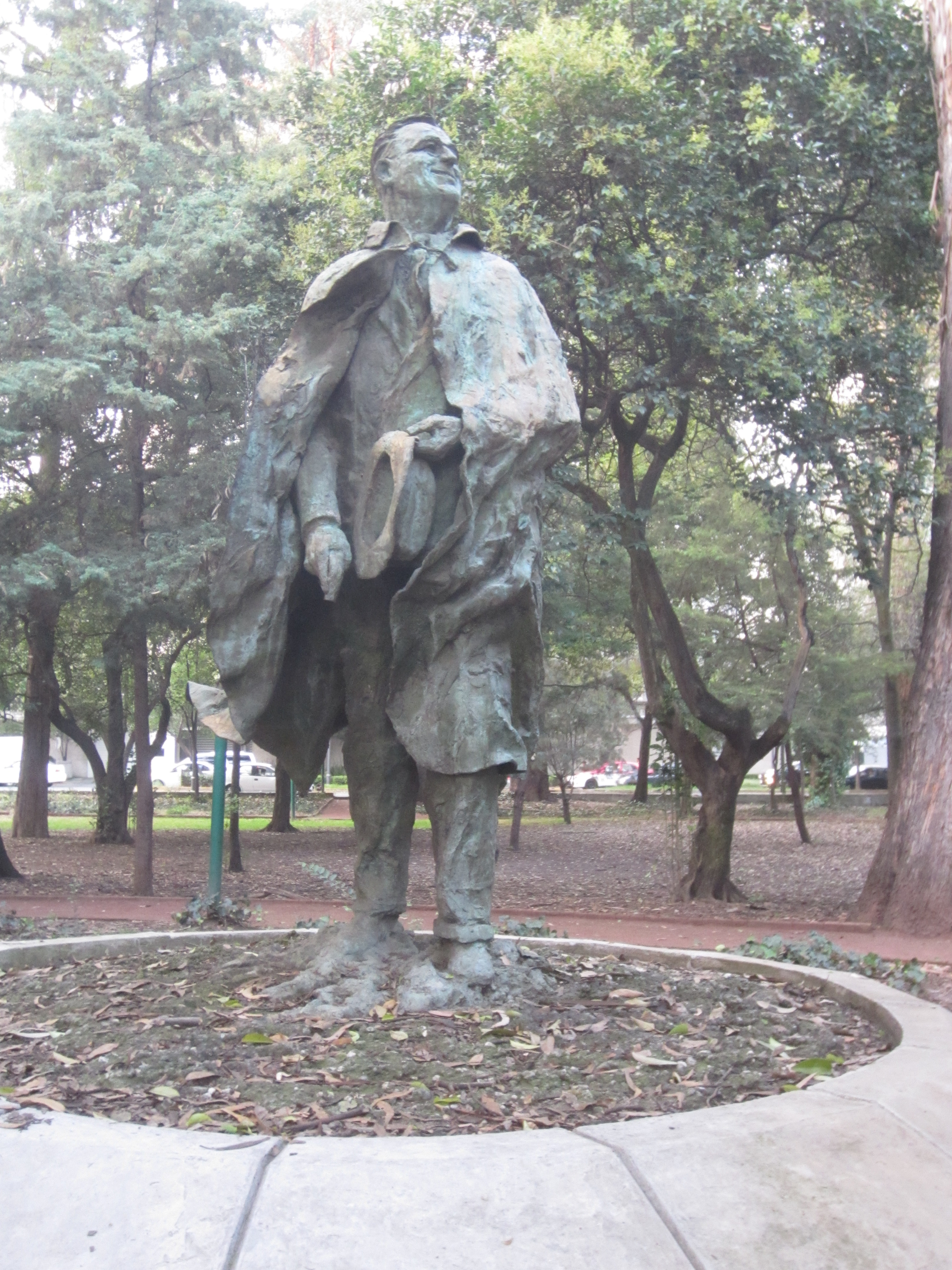
- The statue in 2018
- Subject: Franklin D. Roosevelt
- Location: Mexico City, Mexico; 19°25′36.8″N 99°11′15.5″W

The statue of Franklin D. Roosevelt is installed in Chapultepec, Mexico City, Mexico. The sculpture depicts him standing upright and is 3 m (9.8 ft) tall. This portrayal of Roosevelt is unusual because he suffered from paralytic illness and was unable to walk unaided after his 1920 campaign for vice president. The statue is found close to the National Museum of Anthropology. It was made by Mexican sculpturist Jorge de la Peña Beltrán.

== See also ==
- List of memorials to Franklin D. Roosevelt
- List of sculptures of presidents of the United States
- List of statues of Franklin D. Roosevelt

== Bibliography ==
- González Casillas, Magdalena (2005). Son mil palomas tu caserío, Guadalajara (in Spanish). Guadalajara, Jalisco: Conexión Gráfica. ISBN 9789686295764. OCLC 63701493.
