= Statue of Franklin D. Roosevelt, Grosvenor Square =

Statue in Mayfair, London

Coordinates: 51.511839°N 0.151546°W

Franklin Delano Roosevelt
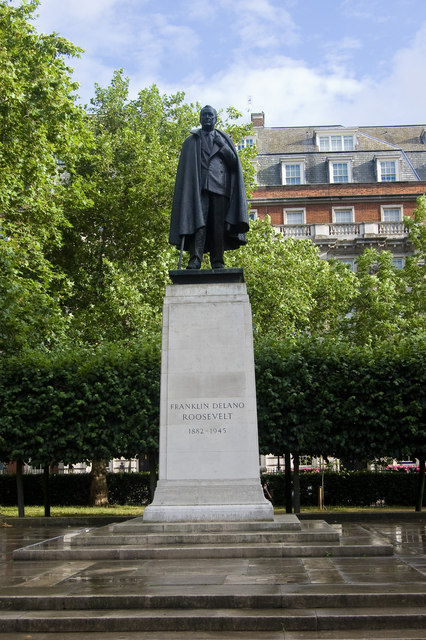
- Artist: William Reid Dick
- Completion date: 1948
- Subject: Franklin D. Roosevelt
- Location: London

Listed Building – Grade II
- Official name: Statue of President Roosevelt in Centre of Square Gardens
- Designated: 14 January 1970
- Reference no.: 1066737

A statue of Franklin D. Roosevelt, by Sir William Reid Dick stands in Grosvenor Square, London. Erected in 1948, it is Grade II listed. The square was made public following the Second World War with the Roosevelt Memorial Act in 1946.

== Background ==
The memorial was proposed by the Pilgrims Society, which promoted good relations between the United States and United Kingdom. The statue was devised to express gratitude towards President Roosevelt who had helped bring the United States to involve itself in the Second World War. Funding therefore was conducted entirely with Britain.

Subscriptions were sold and further funding was provided by the sale of a souvenir brochure. With Winston Churchill and Clement Attlee both broadcasting appeals, the required £40,000 would be raised in only six days.

The statue was unveiled, Eleanor Roosevelt, Franklin's widow, with Churchill, Attlee and members of the royal family also present.

Following the September 11th Attacks the memorial was used as a site of condolence with members of the public being invited to sign a book of condolence.

== Description ==
The statue sits on the northern side of Grosvenor Square, a site which had been provided by the Duke of Westminster. The square was landscaped for accommodation of the memorial scheme with an avenue of trees lined to lead up to the statue.

The design by William Reid Dick involves a bronze statue upon a Portland stone plinth. Dick would provide several designs depicted Roosevelt seated, as the President had difficulties standing or walking after contracting polio at age 40. Controversy surrounding such designs were settled however after Franklin's widow Eleanor insisted on a standing depiction of Roosevelt, with the final design showing him upright with a cane.

== See also ==
- Allies (sculpture)
- List of statues of Franklin D. Roosevelt
- List of memorials of Franklin D. Roosevelt
- List of public art in Mayfair
