= Ace Kilroy =

Serialized webcomic

Ace Kilroy

Ace Kilroy is a serialized adventure webcomic that launched on October 31, 2011. In its first season, it ran in daily black-and-white installments, culminating every week with an extra-long "Color Sunday" that also served as a teaser to the events of the upcoming week.

The co-creation of artists Rob Kelly and Dan O'Connor (who met while attending the Joe Kubert School of Graphic Art), Ace Kilroy features the title character — a World War I veteran turned soldier of fortune — who has to defeat supernatural monsters in order to stop plans of the Nazis. Inspired by mid-20th century comics and monster movies, the webcomic was well received.

== Synopsis ==
Ace Kilroy takes place in 1937, following President Franklin D. Roosevelt's landslide victory to a second term, as the United States Government is secretly preparing for a war in Europe. Thanks to some surveillance work involving the upcoming war, they discover mythological monsters are potentially real, and that they are the focus of an effort by Adolf Hitler's Third Reich. In the story, President Roosevelt and a small band of advisors realize that if the Nazis manage to turn otherworldly monsters to their side, they will be unbeatable. Roosevelt then puts out a word to World War I veteran Ace Kilroy that his country needs him.

In the webcomic's first season, Ace Kilroy goes to Transylvania and discovers the cabin of a previous agent who died under mysterious circumstances. As he searches for clues about the agent left behind, he is met by a young local girl named Anca, who claims to be lost. Ace agrees to help her home, when he is confronted by Anca's sisters, who quickly reveal themselves to be vampires, turned into such by Count Dracula, whom Ace encounters at a nearby castle. Ace then gets involved in a tug of war between fighting Dracula, the Nazis, and saving Anca. This inaugural storyline concluded on April 15, 2012.

After a several-month hiatus, Ace Kilroy returned for Season 2 on August 6, 2012. In this story arc, Ace is on vacation, visiting some old friends, including a former romantic interest named Ellie West, now a Hollywood screenwriter working on "B"-level monster movies. Ace' vacation is cut short by President Roosevelt and Secretary of State Cordell Hull, who send him to Bavaria to search for Dr. Victor Frankenstein and his creation, Frankenstein's Monster.

== Development ==
Before creating Ace Kilroy, Kelly and O'Connor have produced artwork for companies such as ESPN, Vibe, Forbes, Time Out New York, and The Allentown Times. Launching on October 31, 2011, Ace Kilroy has been updated on a daily schedule, with larger, colored pages being released every Sunday. In 2011, Kelly and O'Connor started a Kickstarter campaign in order to raise money and be able to work on the webcomic exclusively, as well as to create a print version of Ace Kilroy.

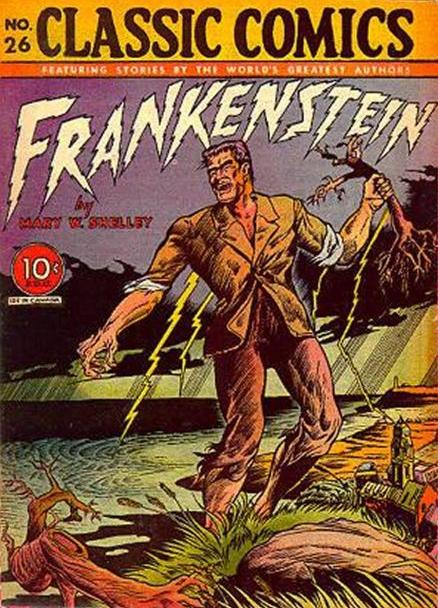
Ace Kilroy was inspired by classic comics and popular monster stories, such as The Monster of Frankenstein.

=== Influences ===
Ace Kilroy draws its inspiration from newspaper adventure strips of the mid-20th century, such as Dick Tracy, Steve Canyon, Buz Sawyer, and Brenda Starr. The webcomic also incorporates the characters and settings from monster movies of the period, specifically the Universal monster films such as Dracula and Frankenstein.

One of the hallmarks of the strip is its use of real people and locations. President Roosevelt and Secretary of State Hull regularly appear, and the webcomic includes numerous mentions of real-world locations of the period, such as the Hay–Adams Hotel and Paramount Pictures.

== Critical reception ==
Ace Kilroy has received favorable reviews from various media outlets. Noel Murray of The A.V. Club praised Kelly and O'Connor for keeping the legacy of classic comics writer such as Roy Crane alive. Meanwhile, Brigid Alverson likened the webcomic to films starring Clark Gable. Jonathon Hoffman wrote for Aroundphilly.com in 2011 that he considered Ace Kilroy "one of the most meticulous, independently produced webcomics I've seen in awhile."

In its first year, Ace Kilroy was nominated for an Eagle Award for the "Favourite Web-Based Comic" category, losing to Freakangels. Kelly and O'Connor were also nominated for the 2012 Philadelphia Geek Awards for "Comic Book Writer of the Year" and "Comic Book Artist of the Year" respectively, with Kelly winning the award.
