= Lawrence Holofcener =

American-British sculptor, lyricist, playwright (1926–2017)

- Born: February 23, 1926; Baltimore, Maryland, United States
- Died: March 4, 2017 (aged 91)
- Known for: Sculpture
- Spouse(s): Carol Shapiro (m. 1954; div. 1968) Julia Cornforth
- Children: 2, including Nicole Holofcener
- Website: http://www.holofcener.com

Lawrence Holofcener (February 23, 1926 – March 4, 2017) was an American-British sculptor, poet, lyricist, playwright, novelist, actor and director. He held British and American dual citizenship.

== Early life ==
Holofcener was born in Baltimore, Maryland, the son of Edward A. and Lillian S. (Stulman) Holofcener. He attended University of Maryland and the University of Wisconsin–Madison where he met and performed with Jerry Bock. They went on to write songs for Big as Life and Your Show of Shows, starring Sid Caesar, Imogene Coca and Carl Reiner. They wrote the Broadway stage scores for Mr. Wonderful and Catch a Star. He joined ASCAP in 1956, his other popular-song compositions include "Without You I'm Nothing", "Raining, It's Raining", "Too Close for Comfort" and "The Story of Alice" which was recorded by the Chad Mitchell Trio. His play Before You Go began on Broadway and has been produced in regional theaters in the United Kingdom, Paris, Sweden, and Mexico City. His musical play I Don't Live There Anymore, written with composer Gerard Kenny, received its American premiere at the 1993 Spoleto Festival USA in Charleston, South Carolina.

== Acting work ==
His acting career began in a nightclub revue in New York at the Upstairs at the Downstairs. His first theater job was in Stop the World – I Want to Get Off on Broadway. Next, in 1964, he played Cornelius in Hello, Dolly!, first with Carol Channing, then Ginger Rogers. He appeared in the 1981 TV Movie Thin Ice (starring Kate Jackson), as well as Walking and Talking, written and directed by his daughter, Nicole Holofcener.

== Writing ==
Holofcener also pursued a literary career. In 1960, he compiled and edited A Practical Dictionary of Rhymes for Crown Publishers. He also wrote Day of Change in 1976. Britishisms, his British-English dictionary was first published, by Partners Press, in 1981.

== Sculpting work ==
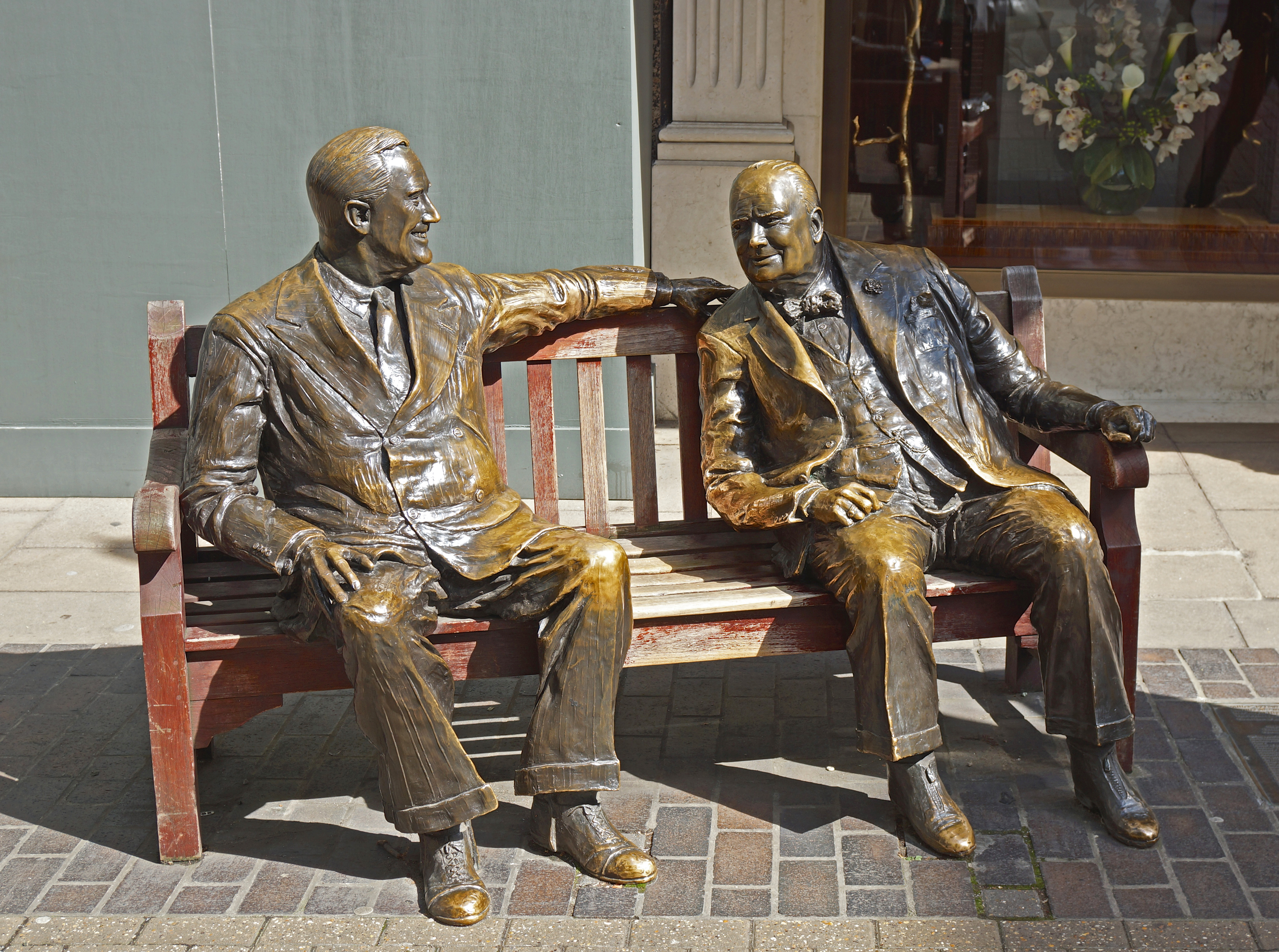
Allies (1995), portraying Winston Churchill and Franklin D. Roosevelt, New Bond Street, London

Holofcener's first exhibition was in 1979 at the Gibbes Museum of Art in Charleston, South Carolina. It was followed by many shows, awards and commissions. During his exhibition at AT&T's Education Center in Princeton, New Jersey, Lawrence produced The Box, a piece which was added to their collection.

In 1985 at the Chichester Festival Theatre, Laurence Olivier unveiled Holofcener's portrait, "Faces of Olivier", and ten years later to the day on Bond Street in London, Princess Margaret unveiled his portraits of Winston Churchill and Franklin Roosevelt. "Allies" has fast become one of London's tourist attractions. Commissions include Queen Victoria for the Isle of Wight's Museum of Island History and Coburg, Germany, as well as a life-size bronze of Thomas Paine at Bordentown, New Jersey.

Other life-size portraits of Thomas Chatterton, William Tyndale and William Penn are in Bristol, England. In 1998, Holofcener embarked on a major series celebrating the contributions made by 20th Century icons, among them Albert Einstein, John F Kennedy, Mother Teresa, Martin Luther King Jr., Nelson Mandela, Frank Sinatra, Muhammad Ali, Mahatma Gandhi, Anne Frank, Eleanor Roosevelt, Leonard Bernstein, Albert Schweitzer, the Three Tenors and John Lennon.

== Personal life and death ==
Holofcener was married twice, first to Carol Joffe, with whom he has two daughters, Suzanne Holofcener and director Nicole Holofcener. They divorced in 1961. He later married Julia Cornforth.

He died in March 2017 at the age of 91.
