= List of memorials of Franklin D. Roosevelt =

== Objects ==
- Roosevelt dime
- Franklin Delano Roosevelt Memorial, on the Tidal Basin, Washington, D.C.

== Buildings ==
- Roosevelt Room of the White House, Washington, D.C.
- F.D. Roosevelt Airport
- F.D. Roosevelt University Hospital with Policlinic Banská Bystrica
- Instituto Roosevelt (formerly: Asilo-Taller Franklin Delano Roosevelt para Niños Inválidos, “Franklin Delano Roosevelt Workshop-Asylum for Disabled Children”), Bogotá, Colombia

== Military vessels ==
- USS Franklin D. Roosevelt (CV-42), in commission 1945–1977
- USS Roosevelt (DDG-80), commissioned in 2000.

== Parks ==
- F. D. Roosevelt State Park in Pine Mountain, Georgia
- Franklin D. Roosevelt State Park in Yorktown, New York
- Franklin D. Roosevelt Four Freedoms Park on Roosevelt Island, New York City, New York
- Franklin Delano Roosevelt Park in South Philadelphia, Pennsylvania
- Parque Franklin Delano Roosevelt in Ciudad de la Costa near Montevideo, Uruguay
- Rooseveltplatz in Vienna, Austria
- Praça Franklin Roosevelt in São Paulo, Brazil
- Roosevelt Campobello International Park on Campobello Island in New Brunswick.

== Schools ==
- Franklin D. Roosevelt High School in Dallas, Texas
- Franklin Delano Roosevelt High School in Brooklyn, New York
- Franklin Delano Roosevelt High School in Hyde Park, New York
- Roosevelt House Public Policy Institute at Hunter College
- Roosevelt University in Chicago, Illinois
- Franklin D. Roosevelt Elementary School in Matamoros, Tamaulipas, Mexico
- Franklin Delano Roosevelt School in Lima, Peru
- Franklin Delano Roosevelt Elementary School in San Lorenzo, Paraguay

== Statues ==
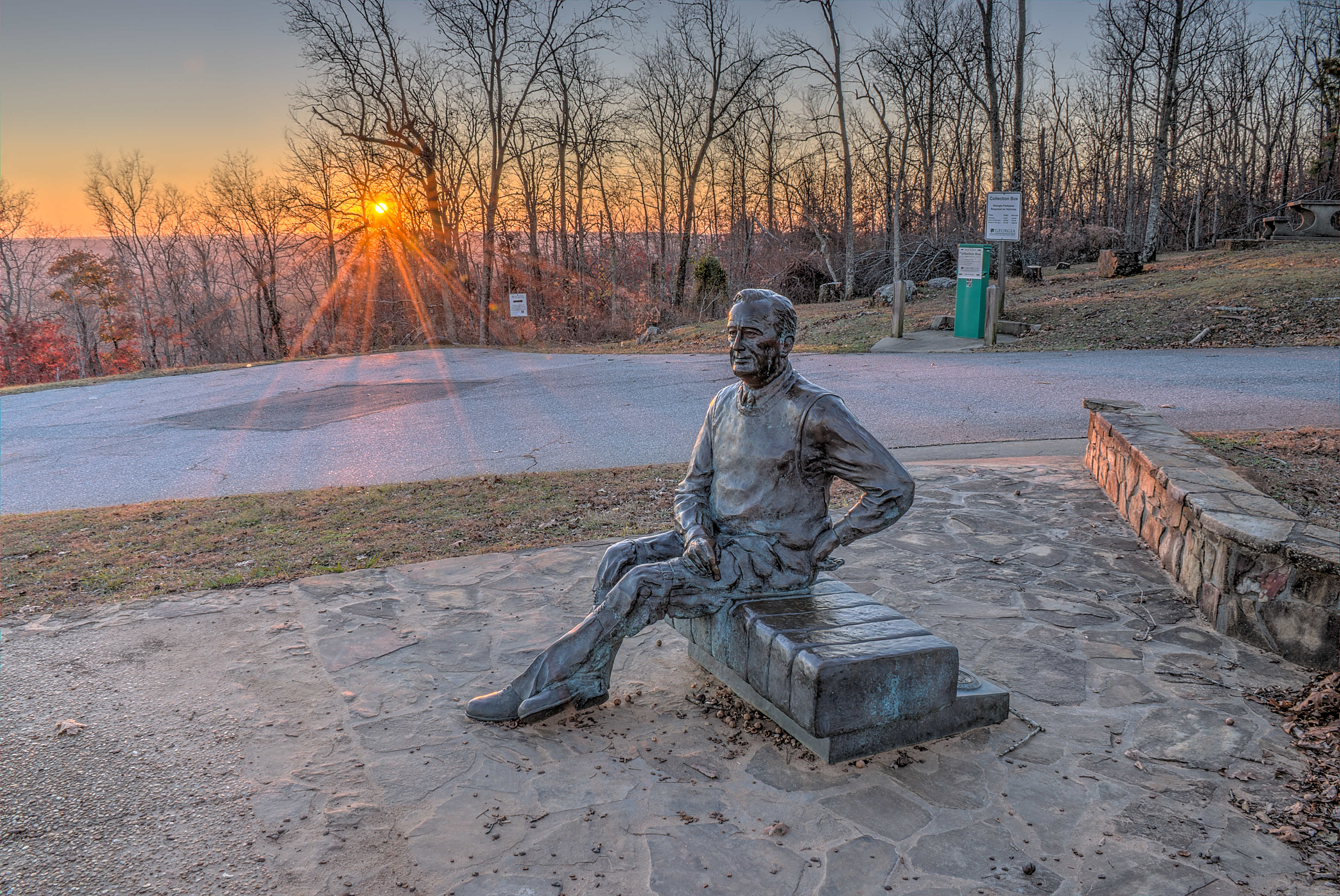
Bronze statue at Dowdell's Knob

- FDR Hope Memorial on Roosevelt Island, New York City
- Franklin D. Roosevelt statue (in sitting position), Avenue Dr. Américo Ricaldoni in Montevideo, Uruguay
- Franklin D. Roosevelt statue (standing), Calz. Mahatma Gandhi in Chapultepec, Mexico City, Mexico
- Franklin D. Roosevelt statue (standing), Grosvenor Square in London, UK
- Franklin D. Roosevelt statue (sitting), Akershusstranda in Oslo, Norway
- Franklin D. Roosevelt statue in Yalta, Crimea
- Franklin D. Roosevelt statue at Dowdell's Knob

== Streets, bridges, and subway stations ==
- South Beach-Franklin Delano Roosevelt Boardwalk, East Shore of Staten Island, New York City, New York
- Franklin Delano Roosevelt Mid-Hudson Bridge, New York
- Franklin Delano Roosevelt Bridge, Maine State Route 189 in the community of Lubec, Maine in the United States with New Brunswick Route 774 on Campobello Island, New Brunswick in Canada
- Franklin D. Roosevelt station in Paris Métro
- Franklin D. Roosevelt East River Drive, Manhattan, New York City, New York
- Franklin Roosevelt Street in Poznań, Poland
- Alameda Franklin Delano Roosevelt, a section of road in San Salvador, El Salvador.
- Franklin D. Roosevelt Memorial Bridge near Pine Mountain, Georgia
- Avenue Franklin-D.-Roosevelt in Paris, France
- Avenue Franklin Roosevelt/Franklin Rooseveltlaan in Brussels, Belgium
- Franklin's Roosevelt Avenue in Limassol, Cyprus
- Roosevelt Avenue in Chatham, England
- Roosevelt Avenue in Quezon City, Metro Manila, Philippines (until January 13, 2022, when it was renamed Fernando Poe Jr. Avenue)
- Franklin D. Roosevelt Avenue in San Juan, Puerto Rico
- Cours Franklin Roosevelt in Lyon, France
- Roosevelt Street in Tehran, Iran – name retired after the 1979 Iranian Revolution
- Roosevelt Road in Taipei, Taiwan
- Roosevelt Road, one of the main roads that connects Guatemala City with Mixco, in Guatemala Department, Guatemala
- Franklin Delano Roosevelt, a road in Ciudad de la Costa near Montevideo, Uruguay
- Franklin Delano Roosevelt, a road in Santa Rosa, Uruguay
- President Rooseveltlaan in Maastricht, Netherlands
- Rooseveltlaan in Amsterdam, Netherlands
- Rooseveltlaan in Ghent, Belgium
- Roosevelt Street, a street in central Belgrade, Serbia
- Roosevelt Street in Brno, Czech Republic
- Roosevelt Street in Prague, Czech Republic
- Roosevelt Street in Košice, Slovakia
- Roosevelt Street in Yalta, Crimea
- Roosevelt Station is the northern terminus of Line 1 of the Manila Light Rail Transit System in Metro Manila, Philippines
- Roosevelt Way in Dagenham, London, England
- Avenue President Franklin Roosevelt in Porto Alegre, Brazil

== Topographical features ==
- Roosevelt Island, New York City, New York
- Franklin D. Roosevelt Lake in Grand Coulee Dam, Washington

== Other ==
- Franklin D. Roosevelt Presidential Library and Museum
- Roosevelt Institute
- The mineral rooseveltite
- Franklin D. Roosevelt VA Medical Center, in Montrose, New York
- Memorial stone in front of the National Archives Research Center building, reportedly requested by Roosevelt in conversation with justice Felix Frankfurter in 1941
- Memorial in Westminster Abbey
- Roosevelt, New Jersey

== See also ==
- Cultural depictions of Franklin D. Roosevelt
- Presidential memorials in the United States
