= Franklin Delano Roosevelt Memorial =

U.S. national memorial in Washington, DC

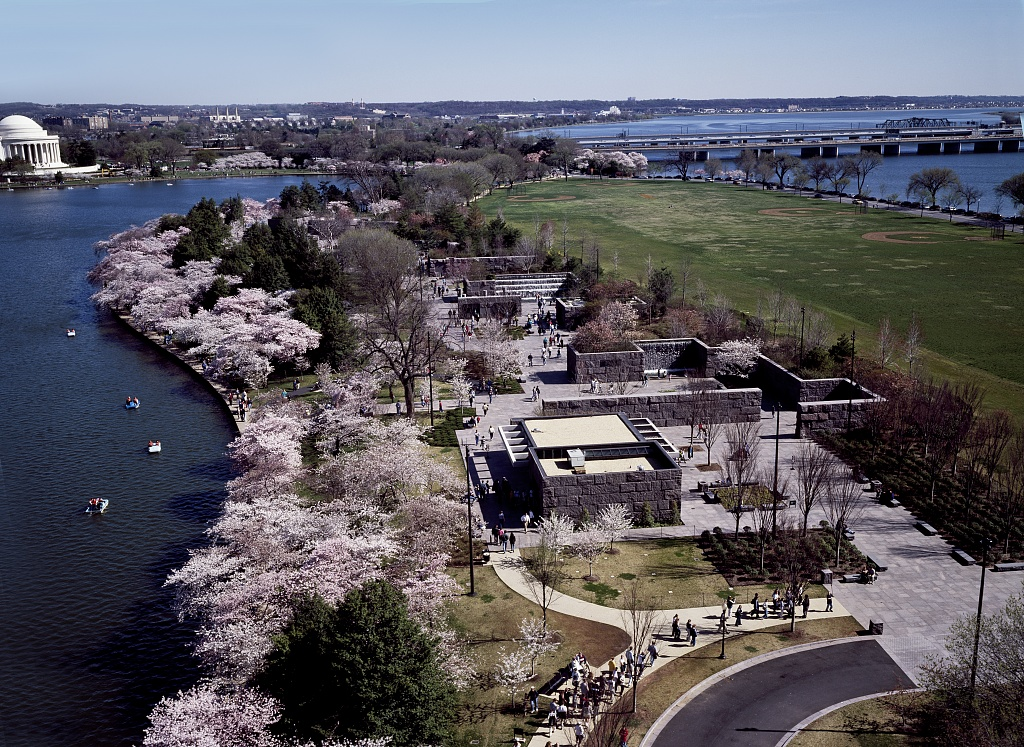
- Aerial view of the Franklin Delano Roosevelt Memorial

- Location within Central Washington, D.C.
- Location: Washington, D.C., United States
- Coordinates: 38°53′2″N 77°2′40″W
- Area: 7.50 acres (3.04 ha)
- Established: May 2, 1997
- Visitors: 2,832,124 (in 2025)
- Governing body: National Park Service
- Website: Franklin Delano Roosevelt Memorial

The Franklin Delano Roosevelt Memorial is a presidential memorial in Washington, D.C., dedicated to the memory of the 32nd president of the United States, Franklin D. Roosevelt. Dedicated on May 2, 1997, by President Bill Clinton, the national memorial is spread over 7.5 acres (3.0 ha) adjacent to the southwest side of the Tidal Basin along the Cherry Tree Walk in West Potomac Park. It traces 12 years of the history of the United States through a sequence of four outdoor rooms, one for each of FDR's terms of office. The memorial is one of two in Washington honoring Roosevelt.

Sculptures inspired by photographs depict the 32nd president alongside his dog Fala. Other sculptures depict scenes from the Great Depression, such as listening to a fireside chat on the radio and waiting in a bread line. A bronze statue of First Lady Eleanor Roosevelt standing before the United Nations emblem honors her work with the United Nations and the Universal Declaration of Human Rights. This is the only presidential memorial to depict a First Lady.

Considering Roosevelt's disability, the memorial's designers intended to create a memorial that would be accessible to those with various physical impairments. Among other features, the memorial includes an area with tactile reliefs with braille writing for people who are blind. However, the memorial faced criticism from disabled activists. Vision-impaired visitors complained that the braille dots were improperly spaced and that some of the braille and reliefs were mounted eight feet off the ground, placing it above the reach of most people.

== Design and features ==
=== History of commission ===
The process of developing the design of the Franklin Delano Roosevelt Memorial encountered significant issues. The memorial was initially proposed by Congress in the 1950s; Congress passed a joint resolution establishing the Franklin Delano Roosevelt Memorial Commission on August 11, 1955. An architectural competition was announced in 1959, with a competition jury including notable architects such as Paul Rudolph. The competition received over 600 entries, with the award jury selecting the proposal of New York firm of Pederson and Tilney, involving eight enormous concrete stelae, one of them 167 feet (51 m) high, inscribed with quotations from Roosevelt's speeches. The Commission of Fine Arts, which had ultimate approval under the Congressional resolution, rejected this design. To try and resolve the issue, Congress passed another joint resolution on October 18, 1962, directing the Franklin Delano Roosevelt Memorial Commission to consider changes to the design that would resolve the objections of the Commission of Fine Arts. The architects submitted revised design in May 1964, which was approved by the Commission of Fine Arts over objections of the Roosevelt family that did not like either version. This project was ultimately not funded, with this first attempt failing entirely after 5 years.

For the second attempt, the Franklin Delano Roosevelt Memorial Commission approached Marcel Breuer. The design developed by him and associate Herbert Beckhard was a pinwheel of tall stone triangles, each 67 feet (20 m), surrounding a granite block with a low relief image of Roosevelt reproduced from a photograph. Hidden speakers would then broadcast recordings of Roosevelt's speeches. The Commission of Fine Arts rejected Breuer's design, feeling it was aesthetically out-of-date, referencing Walter Gropius' 1922 Monument to the March Dead, and "abhorrent, disrespectful and frivolous."

With two heavily publicized failures, the Memorial Commission endorsed a concept of a rose garden with a statue as a stopgap proposal "that meets with the least resistance" until funds were obtained again to start again in 1974.

=== Halprin's design ===
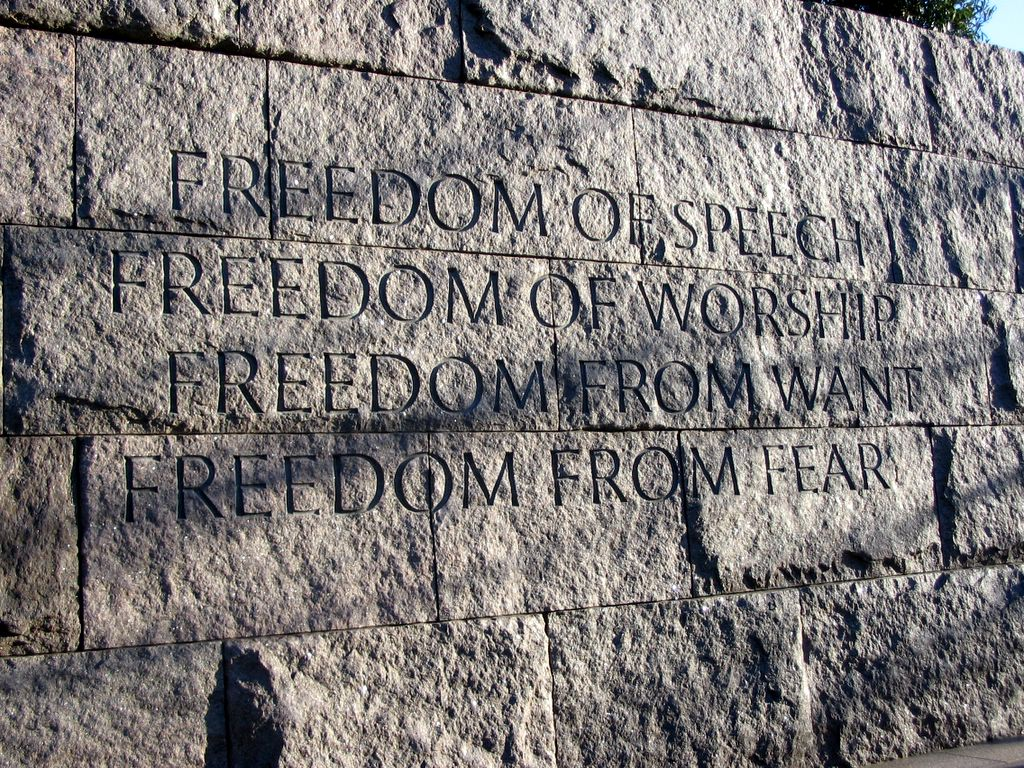
- Roosevelt's Four Freedoms
- 1941 State of the Union Address Roosevelt's 1941 State of the Union Address introducing the theme of the Four Freedoms (starting at 32:02)

The memorial's design and development represents the capstone of a distinguished career for the memorial's designer, landscape architect Lawrence Halprin partly because Halprin had fond memories of Roosevelt, and partly because of the sheer difficulty of the task.

Halprin won the competition for the Memorial's design in 1974. However, Congress did not appropriate the funds to move beyond this conceptual stage for more than 20 years. Halprin collaborated with architect Robert Marquis who designed the visitor center in the winning plans.

The memorial's design concept of four outdoor "rooms" and gardens is animated by water, stone, and sculpture. The national memorial now includes sculptures and works by Leonard Baskin, Neil Estern, Robert Graham, Tom Hardy, and George Segal.

Running water is an important physical and metaphoric component of the memorial. Each of the four "rooms" representing Roosevelt's respective terms in office contains a waterfall. As one moves from room to room, the waterfalls become larger and more complex, reflecting the increasing complexity of a presidency marked by the vast upheavals of economic depression and world war.

Tour guides describe the symbolism of the five main water areas as:

- A single large drop – The crash of the economy that led to the Great Depression
- Multiple stairstep drops – The Tennessee Valley Authority dam-building project
- Chaotic falls at varying angles – World War II
- A still pool – Roosevelt's death
- A wide array combining the earlier waterfalls – A retrospective of Roosevelt's presidency

The architecture critic of the Washington Post stated that the memorial was designed "to give people as many options as possible to go this way or that, to reverse directions, to pause, to start over, to be alone, to meet others, and to experience as many different sights, smells and sounds as the site permits."

When the memorial first opened, people were encouraged to wade into the fountains and waterfalls. However, within a matter of days, the National Park Service (NPS), which operates the Memorial, prohibited people from entering the water due to fear of accidents.

The site is a component of the NPS's National Mall and Memorial Parks administrative unit. As a historic area that the NPS manages, the memorial was administratively listed on the National Register of Historic Places on the date of its establishment, May 2, 1997.

== Wheelchair depiction ==
The statue of Franklin Delano Roosevelt stirred controversy over the issue of his disability. Designers decided against plans to have FDR shown in a wheelchair. Instead, the statue depicts the president in a chair with a cloak obscuring the chair, showing him as he appeared to the public during his life. Roosevelt's reliance on a wheelchair was not publicized during his life, as there was a stigma of weakness and instability associated with any disability. However, historians and some disability-rights advocates wanted his disability to be shown for historical accuracy and to tell the story of what they believed to be the source of his strength.

The sculptor added casters to the back of the chair in deference to advocates, making it a symbolic "wheelchair". The casters are only visible behind the statue.

The National Organization on Disability, headed by the efforts of Alan Reich, raised US$1.65 million over two years to fund the addition of another statue that clearly showed the president in a wheelchair. In January 2001, the additional statue was placed near the memorial entrance showing FDR seated in a wheelchair much like the one he actually used. The memorial's designer construed the wheelchair controversy as evidence of success: "The most important thing about designing is to generate creativity in others, and to be inclusive – to include the needs and experiences of people interacting with the environment, and to let them be part of its creation."

== Gallery ==
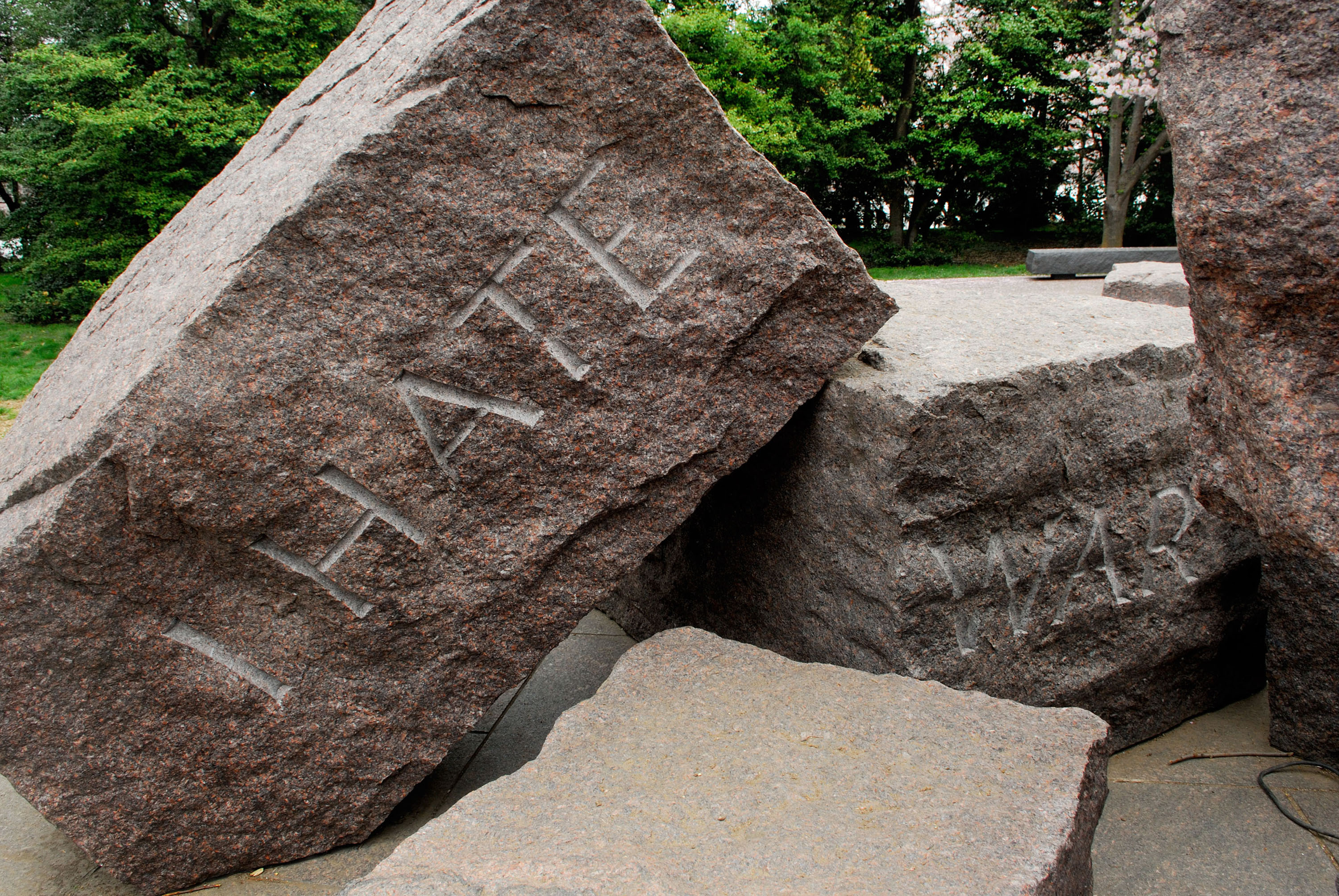
Quote from Roosevelt's 1936 "I Hate War" speech in Chautauqua, New York

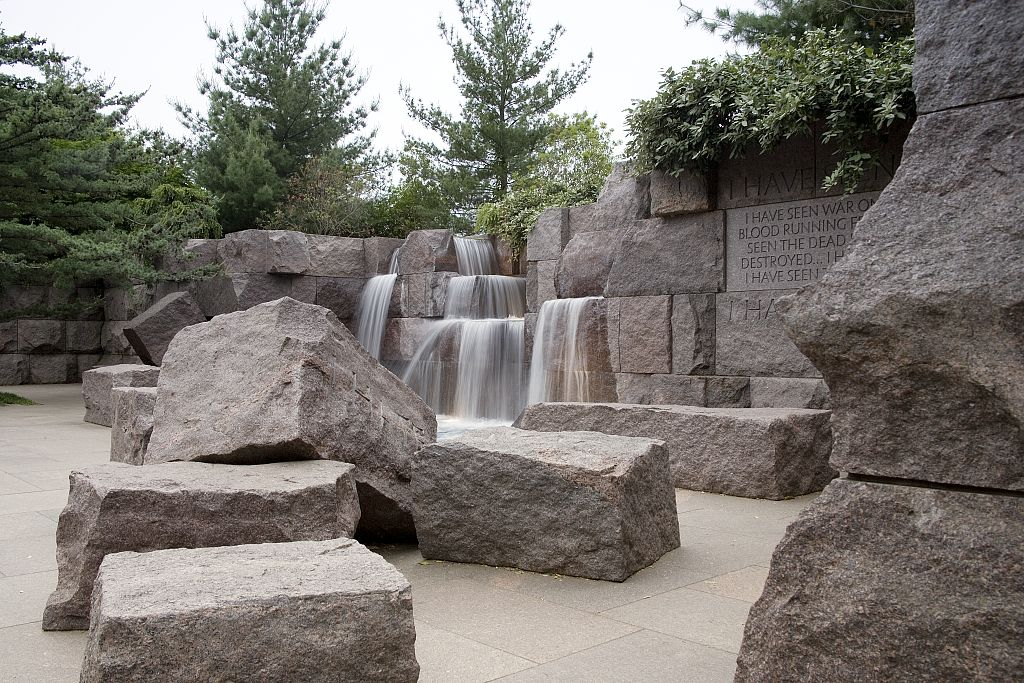
Small manmade waterfalls located in the memorial

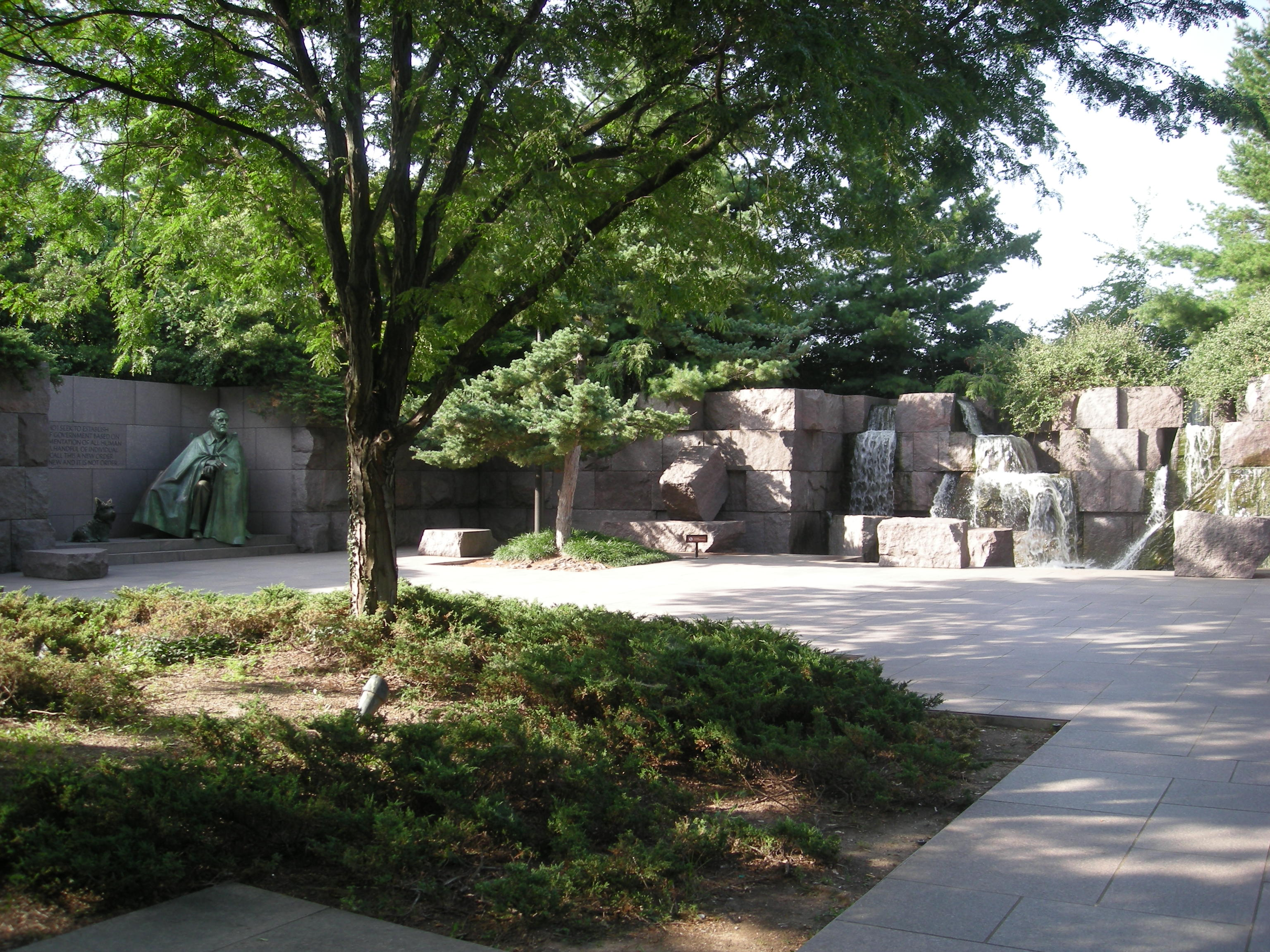
View of FDR with Fala and the waterfalls

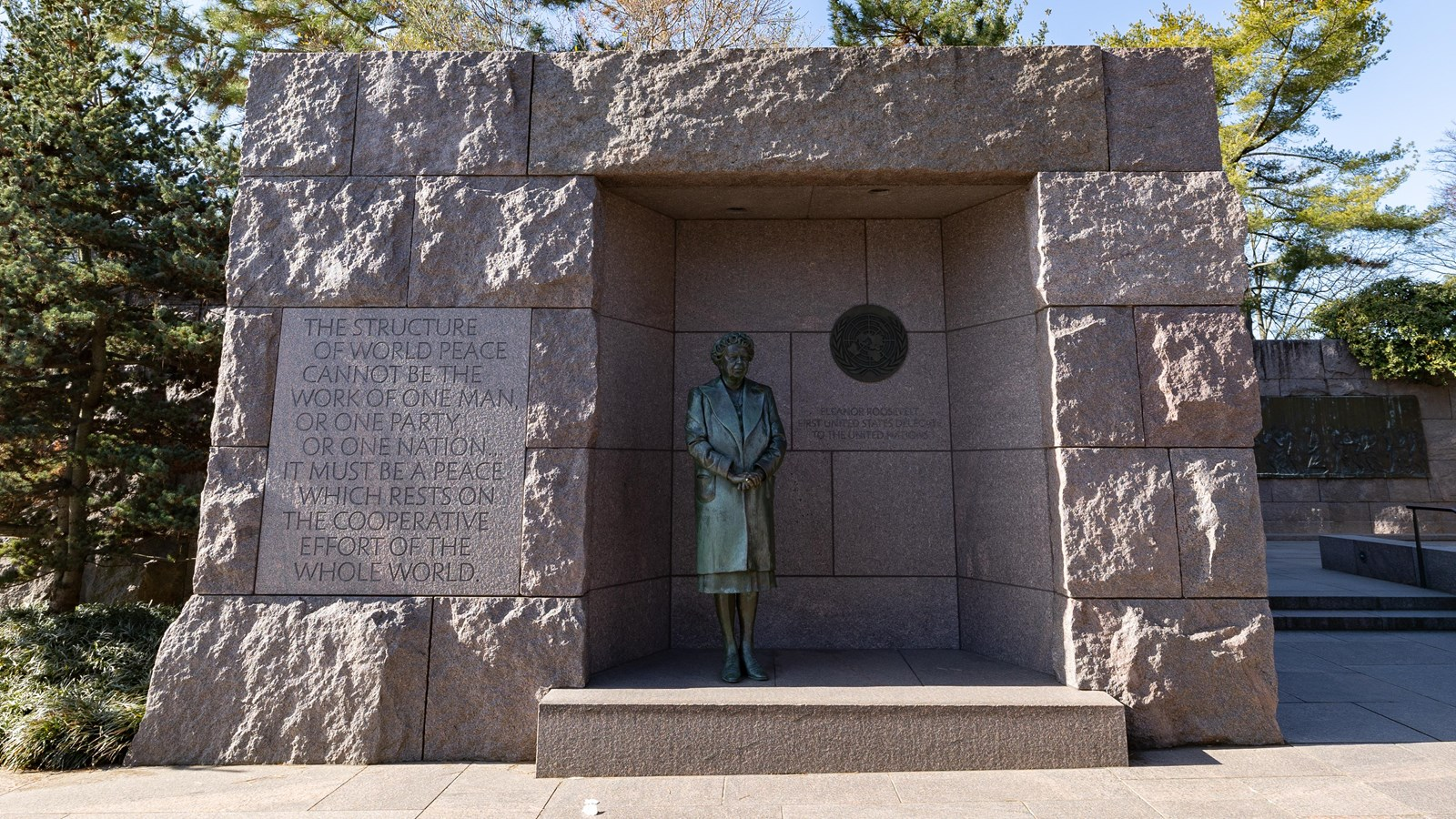
Statue of Eleanor Roosevelt

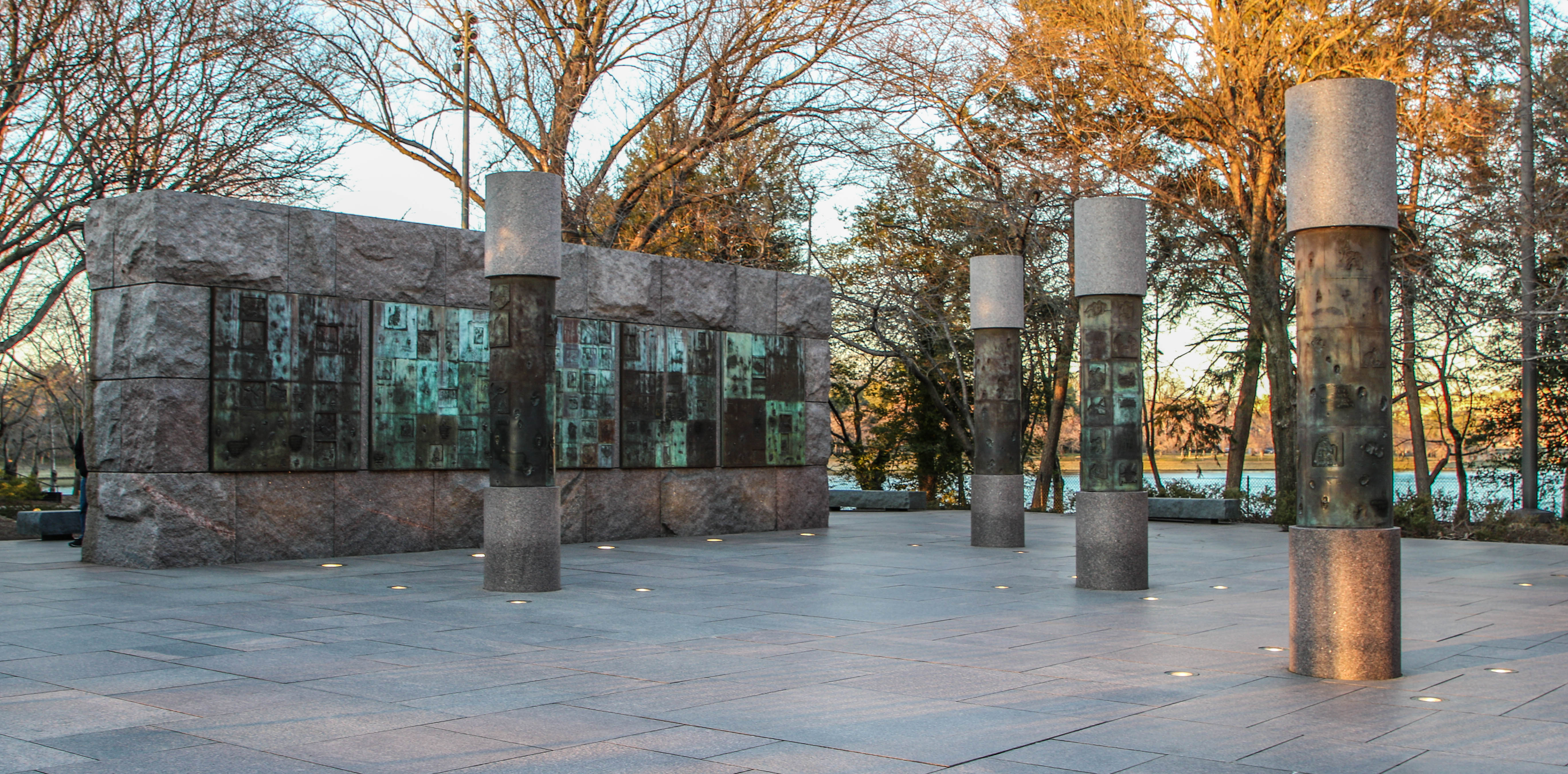
Bronze "mural" and columns in Second Term Room

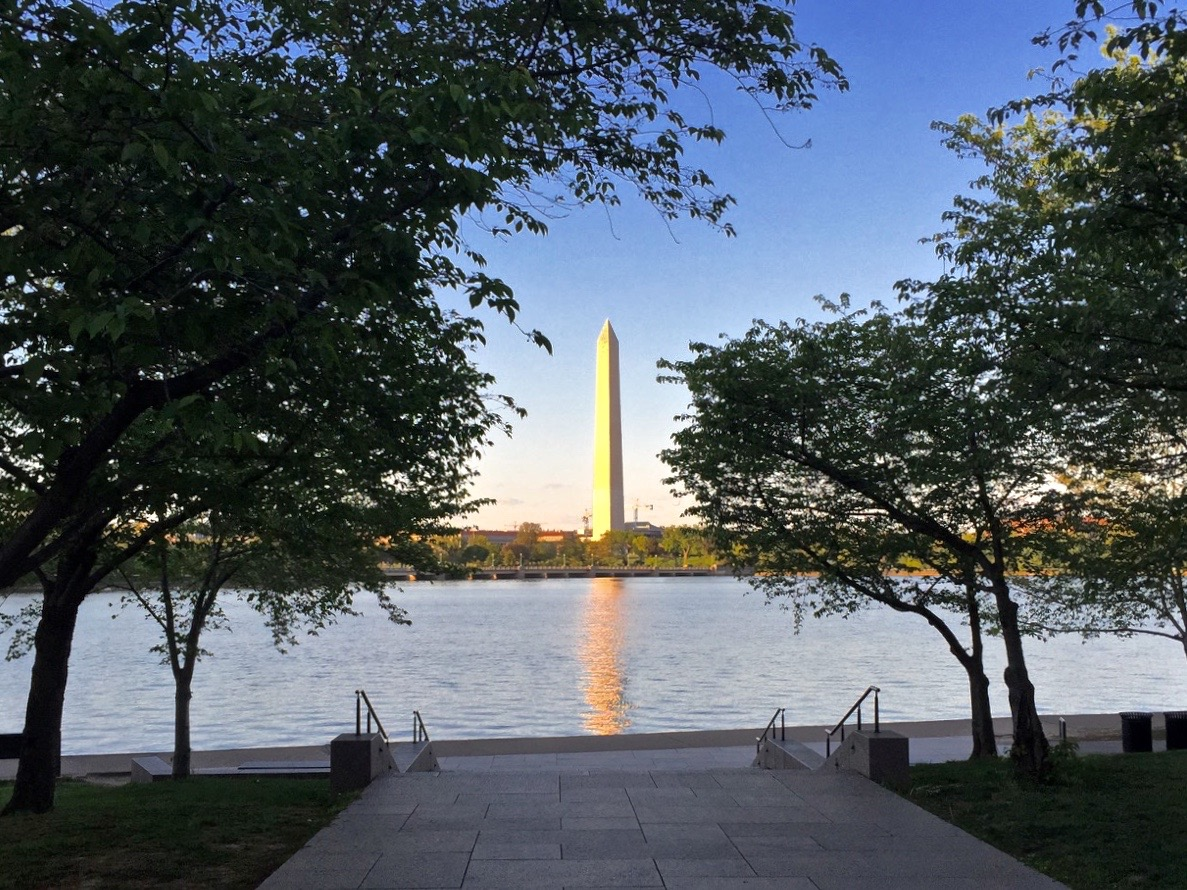
View of the Washington Monument from the FDR Memorial

1997 dedication of the memorial, including (right to left) Bill Clinton, Hillary Clinton, Al Gore, Tipper Gore, and Daniel Inouye

== Original memorial ==
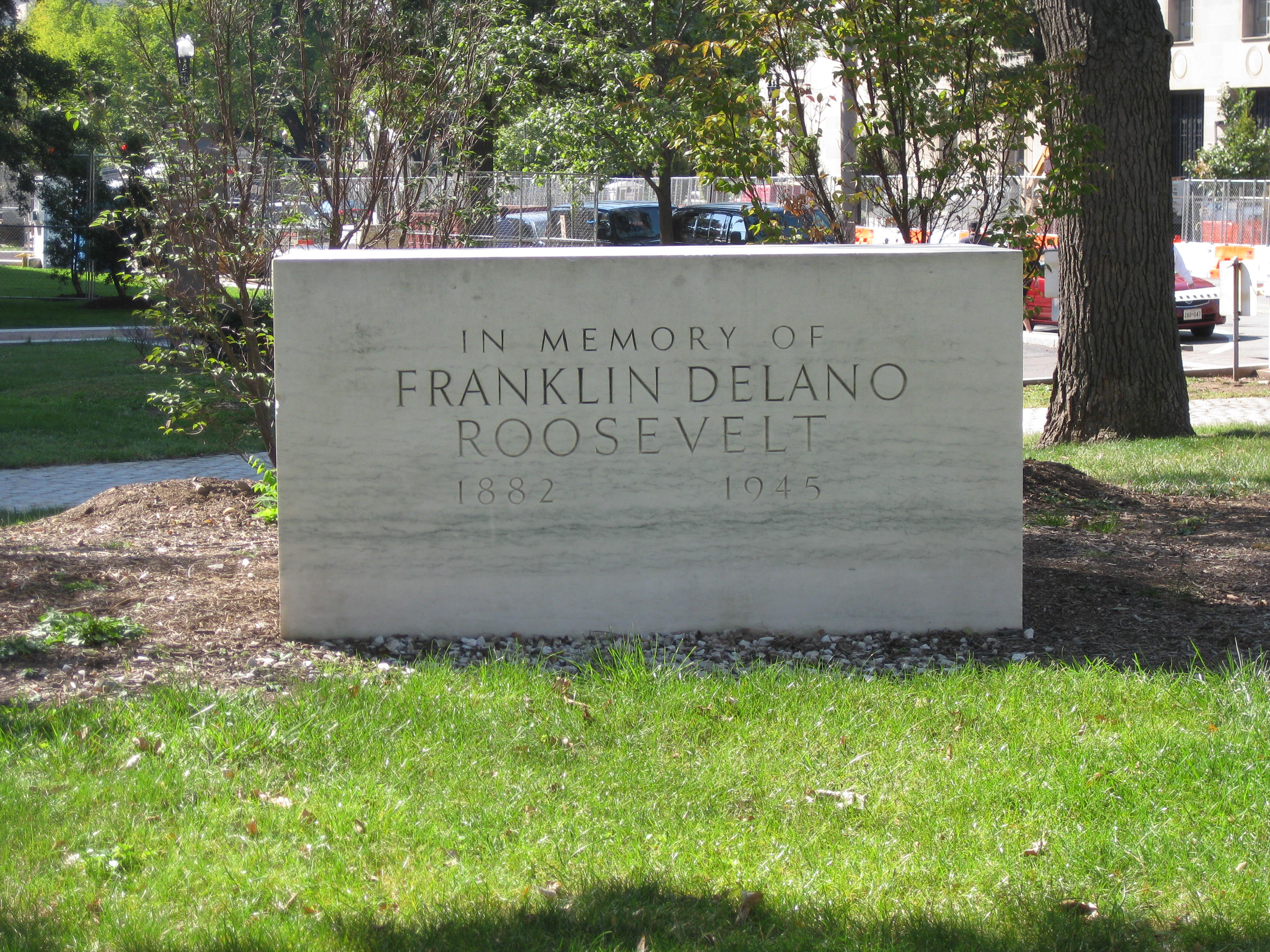
The original FDR Memorial near the corner of 9th Street NW and Pennsylvania Avenue NW

During a conversation that he had with Supreme Court Associate Justice Felix Frankfurter in 1941, Roosevelt said that if he were to have a monument in Washington, it should be in front of the National Archives and should be no larger than his desk. A 3-foot (0.9 m) tall, 7-foot (2.1 m) long, 4-foot (1.2 m) wide block of white marble was subsequently dedicated in 1965 as his memorial near the southeast corner of Ninth Street NW and Pennsylvania Avenue NW, within a lawn in front of the National Archives Building. The engraved words on the memorial state: "In Memory of Franklin Delano Roosevelt 1882–1945".

A bronze plaque at the edge of the sidewalk in front of the memorial states:

In September 1941, President Franklin Delano Roosevelt called his friend, Supreme Court Justice Frankfurter, to the White House and asked the Justice to remember the wish he then expressed:

If any memorial is erected to me, I know exactly what I should like it to be. I should like it to consist of a block about the size of this (putting his hand on his desk) and placed in the center of that green plot in front of the Archives Building. I don't care what it is made of, whether limestone or granite or whatnot, but I want it plain without any ornamentation, with the simple carving, "In Memory of ____".

A small group of living associates of the President, on April 12, 1965, the twentieth anniversary of his death, fulfilled his wish by providing and dedicating this modest memorial.

== See also ==
- List of statues of Franklin D. Roosevelt
- List of national memorials of the United States
- List of sculptures of presidents of the United States
- History of fountains in the United States
- Franklin D. Roosevelt Four Freedoms Park, New York City; site of another memorial park, opened in 2012.
- Architecture of Washington, D.C.
- Presidential memorials in the United States
