= Embassy of the United States, London =

Diplomatic mission of the United States in the United Kingdom

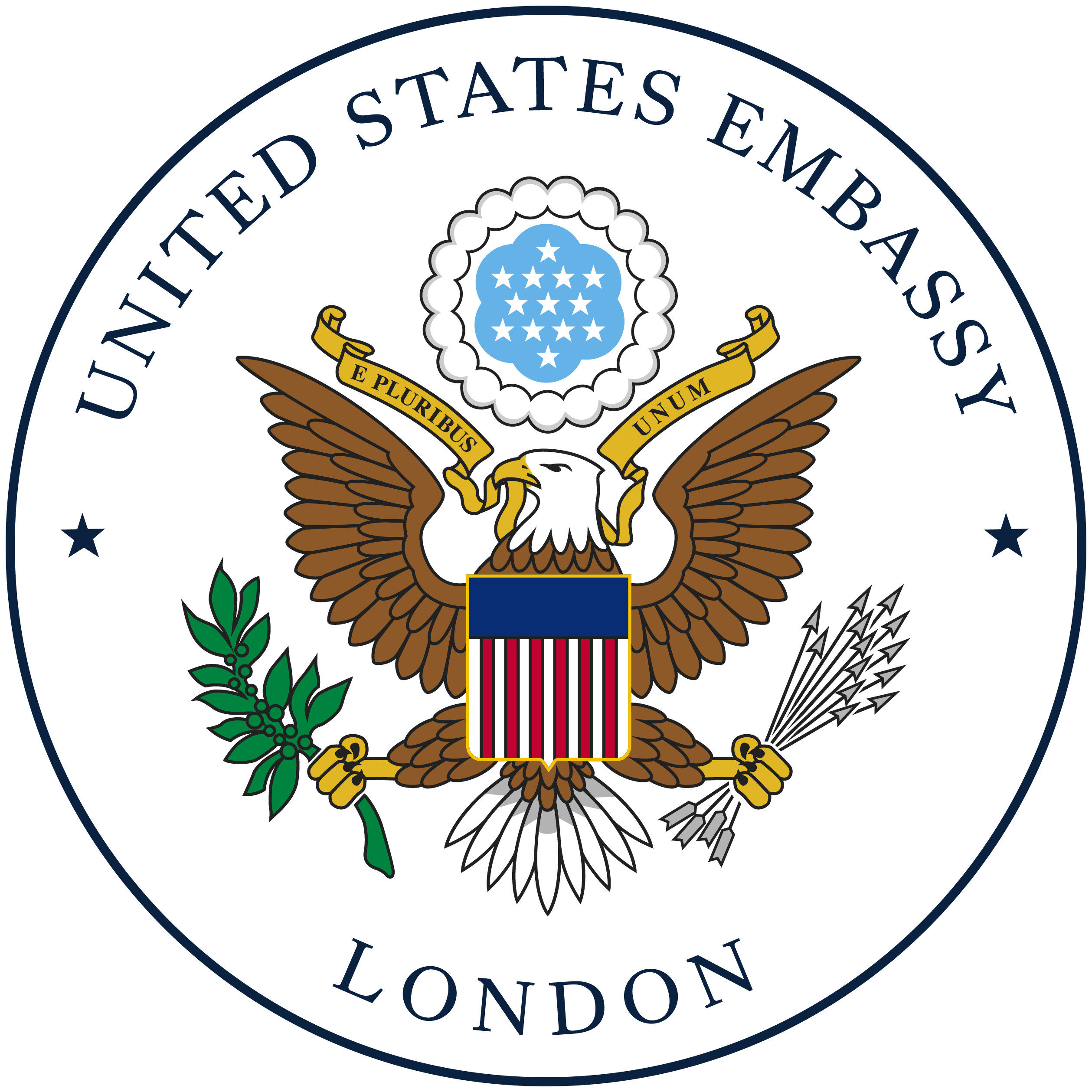
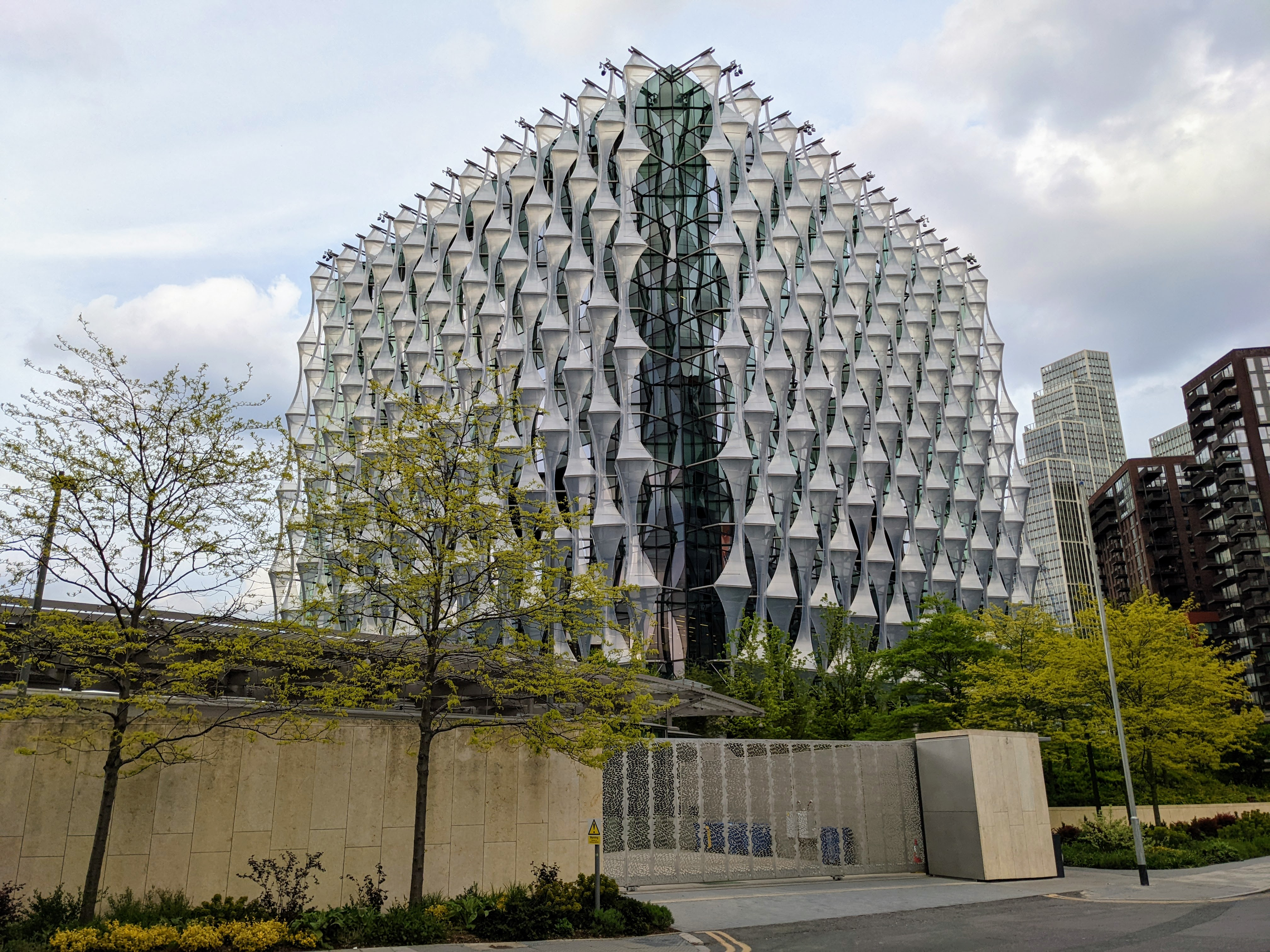
- US Embassy in Nine Elms, London
- Location: 33 Nine Elms Lane, London, SW11 7US
- Coordinates: 51.4826°N 0.1317°W
- Opened: 1785; Nine Elms building: 16 January 2018; 8 years ago
- Ambassador: Warren Stephens (since 2025)
- Jurisdiction: United Kingdom
- Special Envoy: Mark Burnett
- Website: uk.usembassy.gov

The Embassy of the United States of America in London is the diplomatic mission of the United States in the United Kingdom. Its office is located in Nine Elms and is the largest American embassy in Western Europe and the focal point for events relating to the United States held in the United Kingdom.

The embassy building in Nine Elms overlooks the River Thames and has been open to the public since 13 December 2017; it was formally opened on 16 January 2018.

John Adams was the first minister to open an American legation in London, in 1785 at 9 Grosvenor Square, Westminster, London. For much of the 20th century and into the 21st, the chancery was in a purpose-built building in Grosvenor Square.

Since 1955, Winfield House in Regent's Park has served as the ambassador's official residence.

== History ==
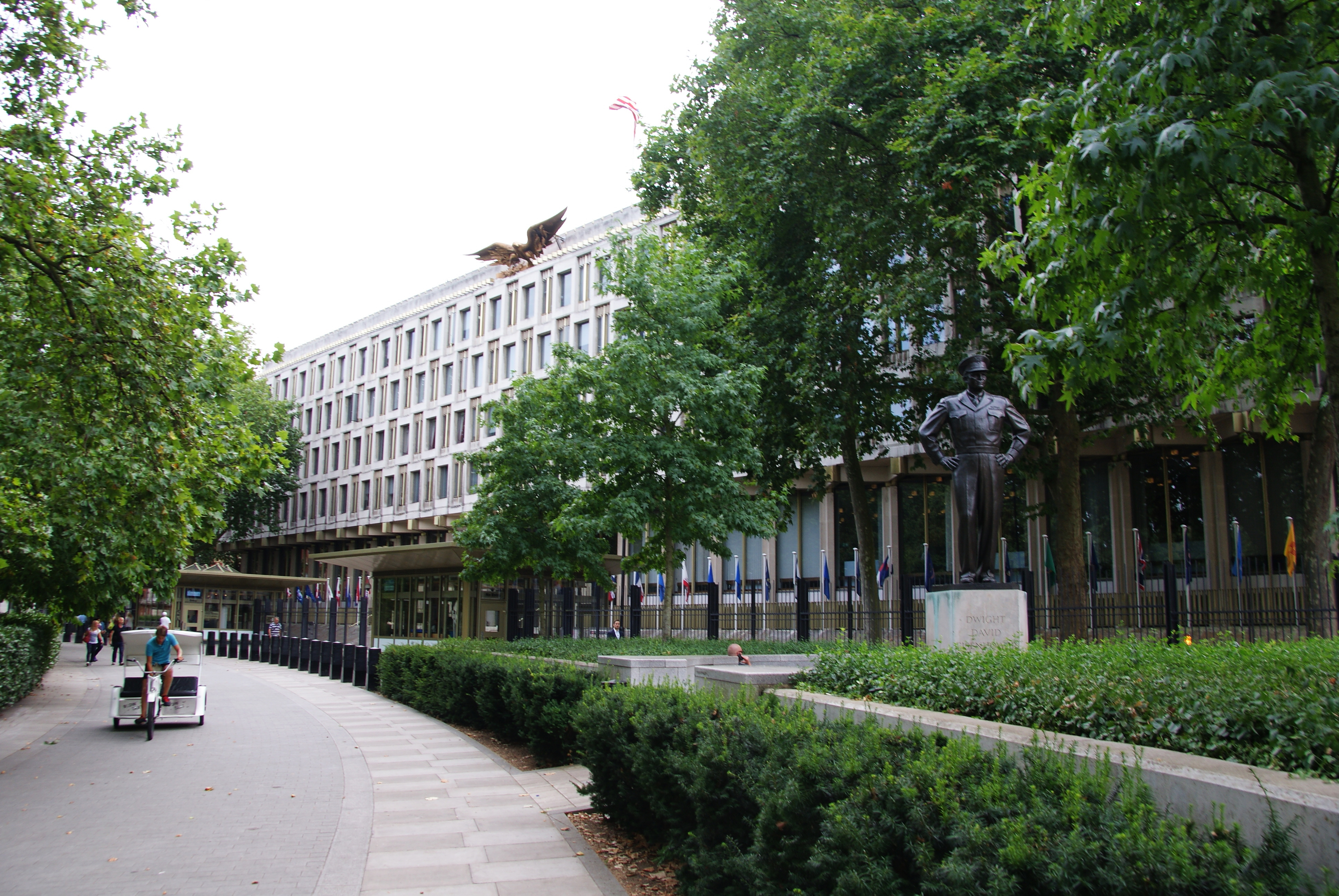
The former embassy chancery in 2014

The American legation in London was first situated in Great Cumberland Place, later moving to Piccadilly, 98 Portland Place (1863–1866), and 123 Victoria Street in Westminster (1883–1893). The legation was upgraded to an embassy in 1893 and remained at Victoria Street until 1912, when it moved to 4 Grosvenor Gardens.

In 1938, the embassy was moved to 1 Grosvenor Square (which later housed part of the Canadian High Commission). During this time, Grosvenor Square began to accommodate several U.S. government offices, including the headquarters of Supreme Allied Commander, General Dwight D. Eisenhower, and the European headquarters of the United States Navy. Following World War II, the Duke of Westminster donated land for a memorial to wartime President Franklin D. Roosevelt. Several additional statues and memorials related to the American and British relationship remain in Grosvenor Square.

The next chancery, at 30 Grosvenor Square, was designed by Finnish American modernist architect Eero Saarinen and constructed in the late 1950s, opening in 1960. The embassy was leased from the Duke of Westminster, being the only embassy that the United States did not own outright. The United States paid only a symbolic peppercorn rent to the Duke of Westminster for use of the land. In response to an American offer to buy the site outright, the duke's trustee requested the return of ancestral lands confiscated following the American Revolutionary War, namely the city of Miami. The chancery had nine storeys, three of which are below ground. A large gilded aluminum bald eagle by Theodore Roszak, with a wingspan of over 11 metres (35 feet), is situated on the roof of the Chancery Building, making it a recognizable London landmark. In October 2009, the building was granted Grade II listed status. The building served as the chancery until 2017, and has been described as a modernist classic and architectural gem. The building reopened in 2025 after substantial interior alterations as The Chancery Rosewood, a luxury hotel.

=== Demonstrations ===
In March 1968, a crowd of some 10,000 demonstrated at Trafalgar Square against US involvement in the Vietnam War, before marching to Grosvenor Square. The Metropolitan Police had attempted to cordon off part of the square nearest to the embassy and there was violence as the crowd broke through the police line. Police horses were used to regain control. 200 demonstrators were arrested and 50 people needed hospital treatment including 25 police officers, one of them with a serious spinal injury. In October of the same year, during a demonstration organised by the Vietnam Solidarity Campaign, a splinter group of 6,000 demonstrators returned to the square. A thousand police officers formed a cordon that the protesters failed to breach and remained relatively peaceful until the crowd began to disperse when there was disorder in the neighbouring streets.

Thousands of protesters marched on the new embassy at Nine Elms as part of a worldwide anti-racism demonstration following the murder of George Floyd in 2020.

On 6 November 2024, the environmental activist group Just Stop Oil vandalised the compound wall of the embassy with orange paint in response to Donald Trump winning the 2024 United States presidential election. Two men were arrested by the Metropolitan Police in response to the incident.

Furthermore, on 10 April 2025, twelve Greenpeace UK activists poured "blood-red" pond dye into the water outside the embassy to protest the U.S.'s arms sales to Israel. As a result, six people were arrested on suspicion of criminal damage and conspiracy to commit criminal damage; the Co-Executive Director of Greenpeace UK, Will McCallum, was among those arrested.

=== Security concerns ===
Security at the Grosvenor Square embassy was tightened in the 1980s and 1990s following successive terrorist attacks on U.S. embassies and consulates worldwide. It was further increased after the September 11 attacks in 2001. A massive security operation at the embassy saw one side of Grosvenor Square closed to public access by car, and armed roadblocks were stationed outside the building. On 29 August 2002, Kerim Chatty, a Swedish citizen of Tunisian descent, was arrested at Stockholm-Västerås Airport trying to board a Ryanair Flight 685 destined for London Stansted Airport with a loaded gun in his luggage. Anonymous intelligence sources cited in the media claimed that the man was planning to hijack the aircraft and crash it into the United States embassy in London, using the rooftop eagle to identify it from the air. Sweden's Security Service, Säpo, denied the claims and called the reports "false information". The man was subsequently cleared of all terrorism-related charges.

The security threat against the embassy prompted the U.S. government to consider moving the embassy. Several British media outlets reported that the U.S. government had wished to use Kensington Palace as their embassy, which allegedly had been vetoed by Queen Elizabeth II, as several members of the British royal family have their residences there. The embassy "strenuously denied" the reports, and a spokesman for Buckingham Palace reported that no formal request had been made. Another possible option was Chelsea Barracks, for which the U.S. Embassy made an unsuccessful bid in February 2007.

=== New building ===
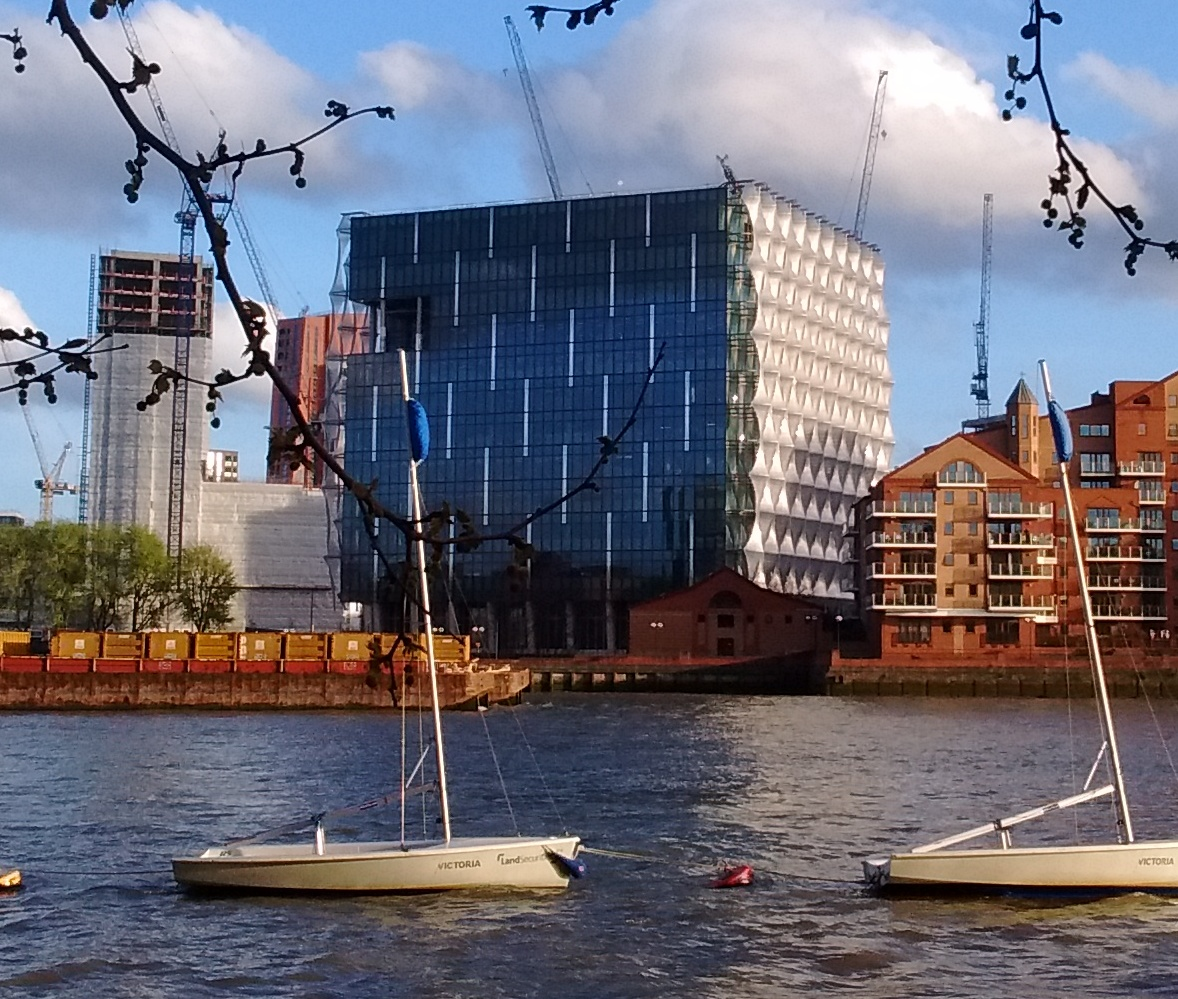
American Embassy nearing completion of construction, as seen from Pimlico, across the River Thames

On 8 October 2008, the embassy announced a conditional agreement with the real estate developer Ballymore Group to purchase property for a new embassy site on the south bank of the River Thames in the Nine Elms area of the London Borough of Wandsworth. The site lies within the Vauxhall/Nine Elms/Battersea Opportunity Area as set out in the London Plan. The proposed plan would only go forward if approved by the United States Congress and by the local planning authority. The Northern line extension to Battersea includes new stations at Battersea and Nine Elms, combined with major local development. The United States Department of State announced in January 2009 that it was choosing among nine architectural firms, all "modern" and "upmarket", to replace the ageing embassy headquarters. In March 2009, the U.S. Department of State's Bureau of Overseas Buildings Operations announced that four architectural firms had been selected for the final phase of the design competition. By law, the architect for a U.S. embassy must be an American firm with "numerous security clearances".

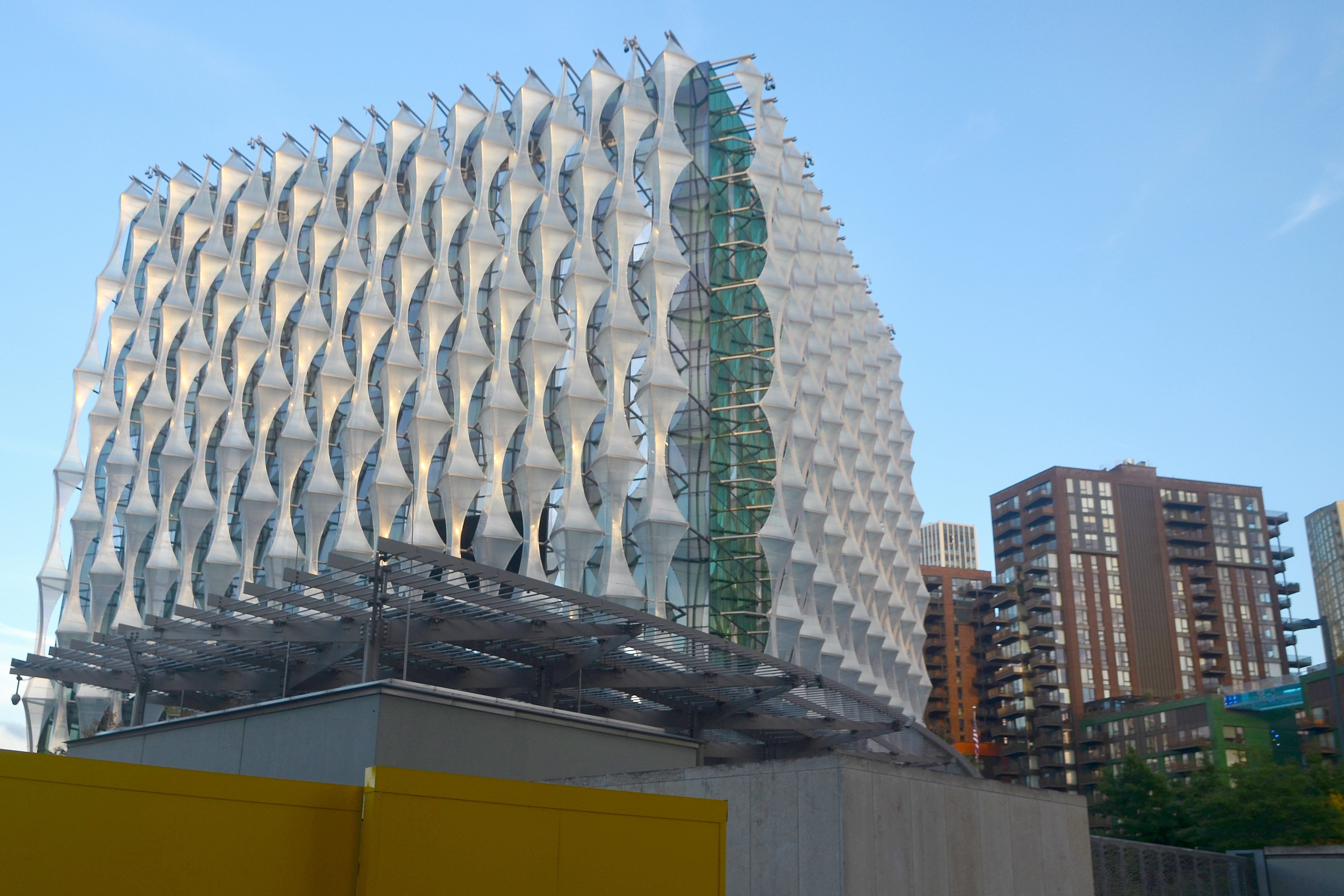
View of the US Embassy building from Ponton Road with the Embassy Gardens Sky Pool in the background

In November 2009, the U.S. government conditionally agreed to sell the lease of the Grosvenor Square Chancery Building to Qatari real-estate investment firm Qatari Diar, which in 2007 purchased Chelsea Barracks. Though the price was undisclosed, the lease's worth was estimated at £500 million in July 2000. The development value of the property was reduced when the building was given Grade II listed status, requiring developers to maintain its current design. The building is now one of Mayfair's 238 listed buildings and monuments. In 2016, plans were approved for the conversion of the building into a hotel.

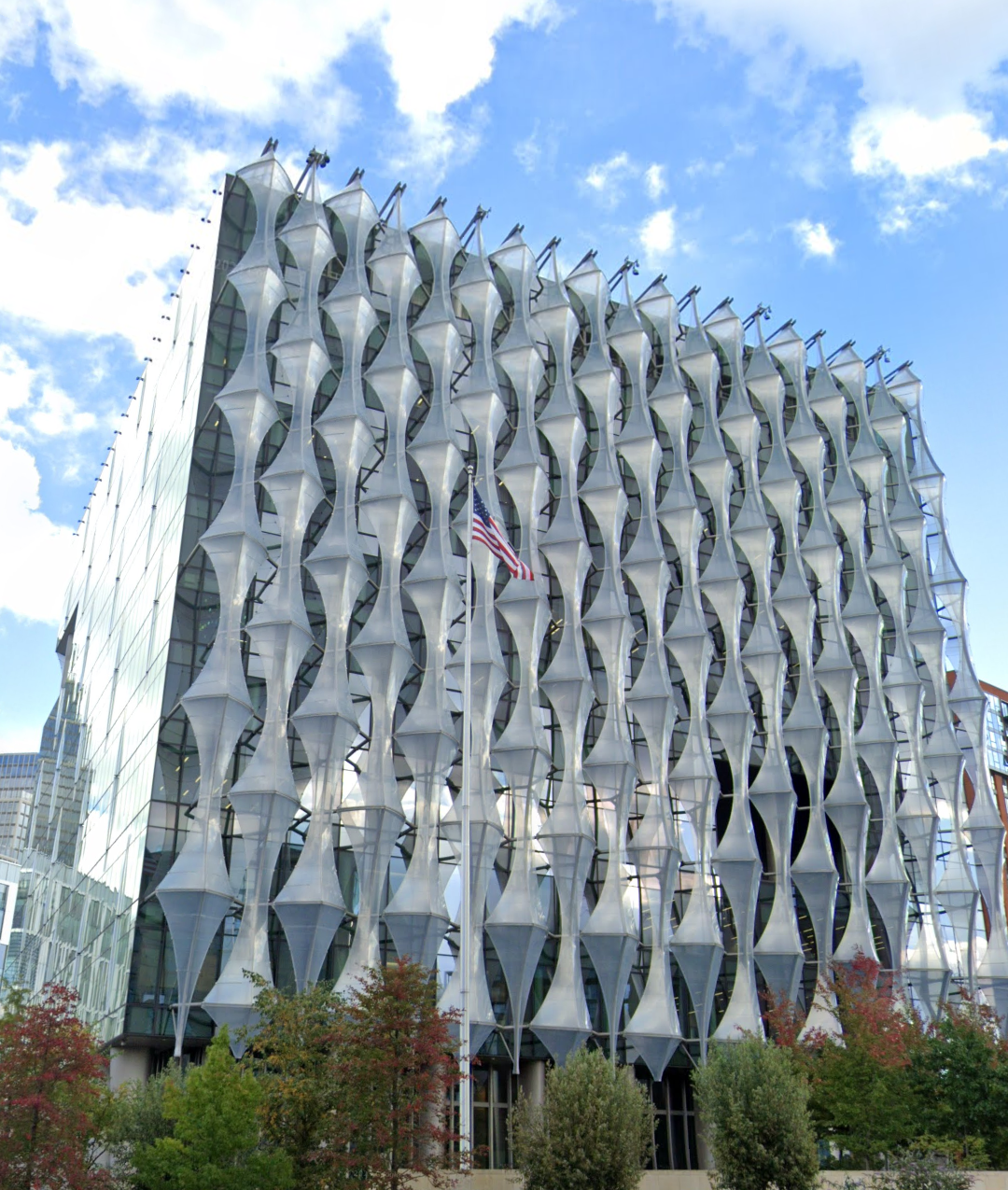
View of the US embassy building from Nine Elms Lane

On 23 February 2010, the U.S. government announced that a team led by the firm of KieranTimberlake had won the competition to design the new embassy building and surrounding green spaces. The winning design resembles a crystalline cube, with a semi-circular pond on one side (called a "moat" by The Times) and surrounded by extensive public green spaces and the Embassy Gardens housing development.

Ground was broken on 13 November 2013, and the building opened to the public on 13 December 2017. US President Donald Trump had been expected to visit in February 2018 to undertake the official opening of the new embassy but, in January 2018, announced he would not make the trip. Trump publicly criticized the cost of the new embassy and its location, as well as the apparent price received for the sale of the lease of the building in Grosvenor Square, blaming the administration of his predecessor, Barack Obama, for making what he referred to as a "bad deal". However, the decision to move the embassy to its new location was made before the Obama administration.

With a tag price of US$1 billion, the Embassy in London was once the most expensive U.S. Embassy building ever, sharing its first position with the Embassy in Beirut until the 2021 groundbreaking of a new $1.2 billion compound in Hanoi.

== Mission leaders ==
=== Ambassador ===
Warren Stephens is currently the Ambassador at the Embassy in London. Winfield House in Regent's Park has been the official residence of the United States Ambassador to the United Kingdom since 1955.

=== Other diplomatic staff ===
- Consul General Belfast, James Applegate
- Consul General Edinburgh, Kathryn Porter
- Consul General Bermuda, Antoinette Hurtado

== Embassy sections ==
- Consular Section
  - American Citizen Services
  - Visa Services
- United States Commercial Service
  - Liaison Office to European Bank for Reconstruction and Development
- Defense Attaché
- Foreign Agricultural Service
- U.S. Customs and Border Protection
- Public Affairs
- Office of Defense Cooperation
- Department of Homeland Security (Immigration)

There are also American consulates general in Belfast, Edinburgh and Hamilton, Bermuda, a Welsh Affairs Office in Cardiff, and a contact centre in Glasgow.

== Previous embassy chancery locations ==
- Great Cumberland Place
- Piccadilly
- 98 Portland Place (1863–1866)
- 123 Victoria Street in Westminster (1883–1893) (1893–1912)
- 4 Grosvenor Gardens (1912–1938)
- 1 Grosvenor Square (1938–1960)
- London Chancery Building in Grosvenor Square (1960–2018)

== See also ==
- United Kingdom–United States relations
- United States Ambassador to the United Kingdom
- Winfield House – the official residence of the United States Ambassador to the United Kingdom
