= Sky Pool =

Sky Pool may refer to:

- Sky Pool, London
- Sky Pool, Houston
