= Works of Vajiravudh =

PATELASHISHKUMARPRAVI

This is a list of works by King Vajiravudh, Rama VI, of Siam. He published dozens of plays, many of them adapted English and French plays, often not as direct translations, but character names and settings localized to Siam. In some cases the texts state that they are adaptations, but which work is not given.

== Bibliography ==
=== English-language plays ===
Published under the name Sri Ayudhya:

- A Real Ghost (1913) - A one-act play
- A Queer Burglary (1915) - An original one-act play
- The Man in Khaki - A one-act play, set in 1914.

=== Plays published without a pseudonym ===
- พระร่วง (Phra Ruang) - A play in คำกลอน verse, adapted from a musical play based on legendary accounts of Si Inthrathit, founder of the Phra Ruang dynasty.
- โรเมโอและจูเลียต (Rōmēʻō læ Čhūlīat) - Adapted from Romeo and Juliet by William Shakespeare
- เวนิสวานิช - Adapted from The Merchant of Venice by William Shakespeare
- ตามใจท่าน (Tām čhai thān) - Adapted from As You Like It by William Shakespeare
- มัทนะพาธา - A five-act original play, not adapted from any prior work.
- หัวใจนักรบ - A three-act play with themes of patriotism and nationalism.
- วิวาห์พระสมุทร
- ฟอกไม่ขาว - A one-act play
- มหาตมะ ("Mahatma") - A three-act play.
- ผิดใจได้ปลื้ม - A one-act play with some singing.

=== Plays published under the pseudonym ศรีอยุธยา (Sri Ayudhya) ===
- จัดการรับเสด็จ - A one-act play.
- ท่านรอง (Thān rō̜ng) - Adapted from Second in Command (1910) by Robert Marshall
- เสือเถ้า (Sư̄a thao) - Adapted from Grumpy (1913) by Horace Hodges and Thomas Wigney Percyval
- งดการสมรส (Ngot kānsomrot) - Adapted from A Marriage Has Been Arranged by Alfred Sutro
- ต้อนรับลูก (Tō̜nrap lūk) - Adapted from an English-language play by Pearl Humphrey
- หมิ่นประมาทศาล - A one-act play.
- หนังสือ - A three-act play.
- ไม่โกรธ - A four-act play.
- เพื่อนตาย) - Adapted from My Friend Jarlet by Arnold Goldsworthy and F. B. Norman
- กลแตก - A four-act play.
- หมายน้ำบ่อหน้า - A four-act play.
- กุศโลบาย
- วังตี่ - Adapted from the libretto of The Mikado by W. S. Gilbert
- ล่ามดี - Adapted from L'Anglais tel qu'on le parle by Tristan Bernard.
- มิตรแท้ - Adapted from My Friend Jarlet by Arnold Goldsworthy and F. B. Norman
- วิไลเลือกคู่ - Adapted from Les Vivacités du Capitaine Tic by Édouard Martin and Eugène Labiche
- นินทาสโมสร - Adapted from The School for Scandal (1777) by Richard Brinsley Sheridan
- ขนมสมกับน้ำยา - A one-act play, first published in the newspaper Dusit Samit.
- หลวงจำเนียรเดินทาง - A four-act comedy, adapted from Le Voyage de Monsieu Perrichon by Eugène Labiche.
- โพงพาง - A one-act play.
- ปล่อยแก่
- เสียสละ - A four-act play.
- หาเมียให้ผัว - A three-act comedy, adapted from Her Husband's Wife by Albert Ellsworth Thomas.
- แก้แค้น - A one-act play.
- ผู้ร้ายแผลง - A one-act play.
- บ่วงมาร - A four-act play.
- หาโล่ห์ - A four-act play.
- เจ้าข้า,สารวัด - A one-act play.
- ฉวยอำนาจ - A one-act play.
- เกินต้องการ - Adapted from Pouloiller by Tristan Bernard
- หมอจำเป็น - Adapted from Le Médecin Malgré Lui by Molière
- คดีสำคัญ - Adapted from Un Client Serieux by Georges Courteline.
- ตบตา - Adapted from La Poudre aux Yeux by Eugène Labiche.
- ตั๊กแตน - Adapted from Les Sauterelles by Emile Fabre.
- เกียรติยศญี่ปุ่น - Adapted from L'Honneur japonais by Paul Anthelme Bourde.
- ร.ต.ล.นนทรี - Adapted from a play by G. E. Piérard
- หนามยอกเอาหนามบ่ง
- ผิดวินัย - A three-act play, adapted from the English play French Leaves by Reginald Bardley.

=== Plays published under the pseudonym พระขรรค์เพชร (Phra Khan Phet) ===
- ความดีมีไชย - A three-act play, first performed 26 November 1908.
- เห็นแก่ลูก - A one-act play.
- น้อยอินทเสน - A three-act comedy, based on an English-language play

=== Plays published under other pseudonyms ===
- ชิงนาง (Ching nāng) - A four-act play, adapted from The Rivals (1775) by Richard Brinsley Sheridan. Published under the pseudonym สภานายก ท.ป.ส.
- ชื่นใจไม่สมัคร - A six-act play, published under the pseudonym ไก่เขียว.

=== Short fiction ===
==== Thong-In series ====
Mystery stories about a Thai detective named Thong-In Ratananetr (นายทองอิน รัตนะเนตร์), whose last name literally means "diamond eyes", and his lawyer sidekick Wat (นายวัด), drawing inspiration from the Sherlock Holmes and Watson stories by Arthur Conan Doyle. They were first published 1903–1907, mostly in the periodical ทวีปัญญา (Thawi Panya), under the pseudonym นายแก้ว นายขวัญ, later sometimes collected under the pen name รามจิตติ. Eleven of the stories were printed many times as a collection titled นิทานทองอิน (The Tales of Thong-In), but a total of 15 stories were written. The collection is divided into two volumes, separated by the apparent death and subsequent reappearance of the title character, mimicking what Arthur Conan Doyle did with Sherlock Holmes.

The story titles are:

- นากพระโขนงที่สอง ("The Return of the Ghost of Phra Khanong")
- นายสุวรรณถูกขโมย
- ความลับแผ่นดิน
- นายสวัสดิ์ – "ปิตุฆาต"
- ยาม้าบังกะโล ("The Drugging of Bungalow the Racehorse") - likely inspired by Silver Blaze
- เข็มร้อยดอกไม้
- กำนันคงบ้านโยคี
- อ้ายมั่นมือเหล็ก ("Ai Man, the Iron-Handed") - possibly inspired by "The Final Problem"
- จดหมายจากเมืองเประ
- นายอำเภอทับกวาง
- ผู้ร้ายฆ่าคนที่บางขุนพรหม
- นายจรูญเศรษฐี
- ระเด่นลันได ("Raden Landai the Beggarman") - possibly inspired by "The Man with the Twisted Lip" and "The Sign of Four"
- สร้อยคอร้อยชั่ง

=== Novels ===
- หัวใจชายหนุ่ม - An epistolary novel, written as a series of letters from a young Siamese man, published under the pseudonym รามจิตติ
- ฟันเสือ (Les Dents du tigre / The Teeth of the Tiger) - A translation of one of the Arsène Lupin novels by Maurice Leblanc, about a gentleman master thief. Published as a five-volume collection in 1918.
- ลายแทงแสดงขุมทรัพย์ตำบลทิกเกนโคด (The Tickencote Treasure) - A translation of the novel by William Le Queux, published as a four-volume set in 1917.

=== Essays ===
- เกียรติศักดิ์ทหารเสือ ["The Honour of Tiger Soldiers"] - Based on ancient French chivalric rhyme "Mon âme â Dieu, Ma vie au Roi, Mon coeur aux Dames, L'honneur pour moi."
- ยิวแห่งบูรพาทิศ ["Jews of the Orient"] (1914) - An anti-Chinese tract.
