= Grosvenor Square =

Square in Mayfair, London, England

Coordinates: 51°30′41″N 0°09′05″W

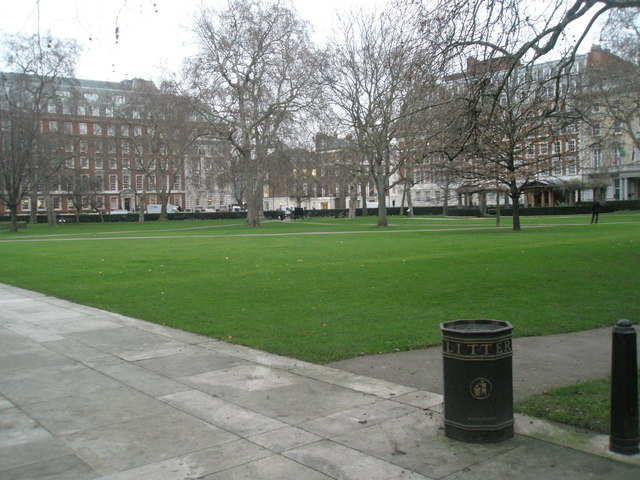
The central garden in Grosvenor Square, now a public park (pictured November 2008)

Grosvenor Square (/ˈɡroʊvənər/ GROH-vən-ər) is a large garden square in the Mayfair district of Westminster, Greater London. It is the centrepiece of the Mayfair property of the Duke of Westminster, and takes its name from the duke's surname "Grosvenor". It was developed for fashionable residences in the 18th century. In the 20th it had an American and Canadian diplomatic presence, and currently is mixed use, commercial.

== History ==
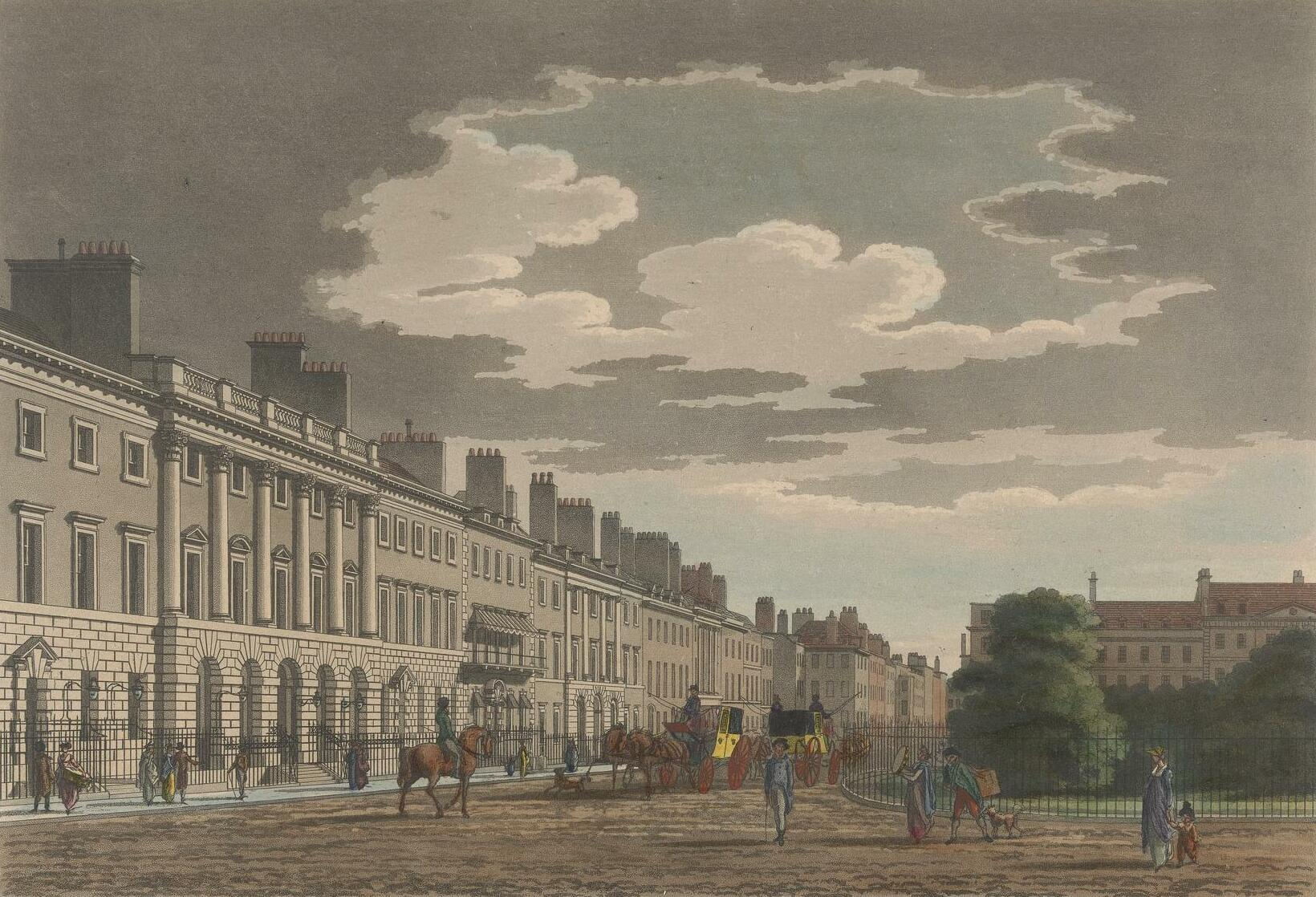
The north side of Grosvenor Square in the 18th or early 19th century. The three houses at the far left form a unified group, but the others on this side are individually designed. Most later London squares would be more uniform.

Sir Richard Grosvenor obtained a licence to develop Grosvenor Square and the surrounding streets in 1710, and development took place between 1725 and 1731. The land was sold in individual plots, with 30 different builders or partnerships taking a lease; about half of these had become bankrupt by 1738. Grosvenor Square was one of the three or four most fashionable residential addresses in London from its construction until the Second World War, with numerous leading members of the aristocracy in residence.

The early houses were generally of five or seven bays, with basement, three main stories and an attic. Some attempt was made to produce impressive groupings of houses, and Colen Campbell produced a design for a palatial east side to the square featuring thirty Corinthian columns but this was not carried out and in the end most of the houses were built to individual designs. There were mews behind all four sides.

Many of the houses were rebuilt later in the 18th century or during the 19th century, generally acquiring an extra storey when this happened. Number 23 (later 26) was rebuilt in 1773–74 for the 11th Earl of Derby by Robert Adam, and is regarded as one of the architect's finest works and as a seminal example of how grandeur of effect and sophisticated planning might be achieved on a confined site. It was demolished and rebuilt again in the 1860s. Nearly all of the older houses were demolished during the 20th century and replaced with blocks of flats in a neo-Georgian style, hotels and embassies.

=== The garden ===
Providing almost 2.5 hectares of open garden, Grosvenor Square is the second-largest garden square in central London after Russell Square at 2.5 hectares. While Lincoln's Inn Fields at 4.5 hectares is a larger space, it is categorised as an Inn of Court, not a garden square.

Roosevelt Memorial Act 1946 (Note: Section 9.)
- Act of Parliament
- Parliament of the United Kingdom
- Long title: An Act to provide for the erection in Grosvenor Square, in the City of Westminster, of a statue of Franklin Delano Roosevelt, the laying out of the Square as a garden and its opening for the use and enjoyment of the public in perpetuity; and for purposes connected with the matters aforesaid.
- Citation: 9 & 10 Geo. 6. c. 83
- Territorial extent: United Kingdom

Dates
- Royal assent: 6 November 1946
- Commencement: 6 November 1946 (Note: The Acts of Parliament (Commencement) Act 1793.)

Status: Current legislation

Text of statute as originally enacted

Grosvenor Square was originally laid out by gardener John Alston in the 1720s; his 'wilderness worke' design was a celebration of the countryside in the city. However, the gardens have been modified over time to meet the changing needs of those around them. Reserved for residents' use for much of its life, the Grade II-registered landscape was, after the Second World War, made a public space for everyone's enjoyment, through the Roosevelt Memorial Act 1946 (9 & 10 Geo. 6. c. 83). It was then managed by the Royal Parks until 2018, when Grosvenor Britain & Ireland took over its management.

Following an international Call for Ideas in 2018, Grosvenor confirmed that the square would be redesigned to enhance its contribution to the environment and local communities. While the site had previously consisted largely of an open lawn with a perimeter path, it was transformed through the planting of over 70,000 plants representing 63 species, along with 80,000 bulbs, 44 new trees, and the creation of two new wetland areas. The design followed a forest-inspired approach, incorporating a mix of trees, shrubs, perennials, bulbs, and wetland vegetation. This project involved an expenditure of £25 million. The site was reopened to the public on July 20, 2026.

=== Bentley Boys of the 1920s ===
In the 1920s, four of the "Bentley Boys" – Woolf Barnato, Tim Birkin, Glen Kidston and Bernard Rubin – took adjacent flats in the south-east corner of the square, where their day-long parties became something of social legend. So common was the sight of their large, green sports cars parked ad hoc outside their flats, that for many years London cab drivers referred to the spot as "Bentley Corner".

=== American presence ===
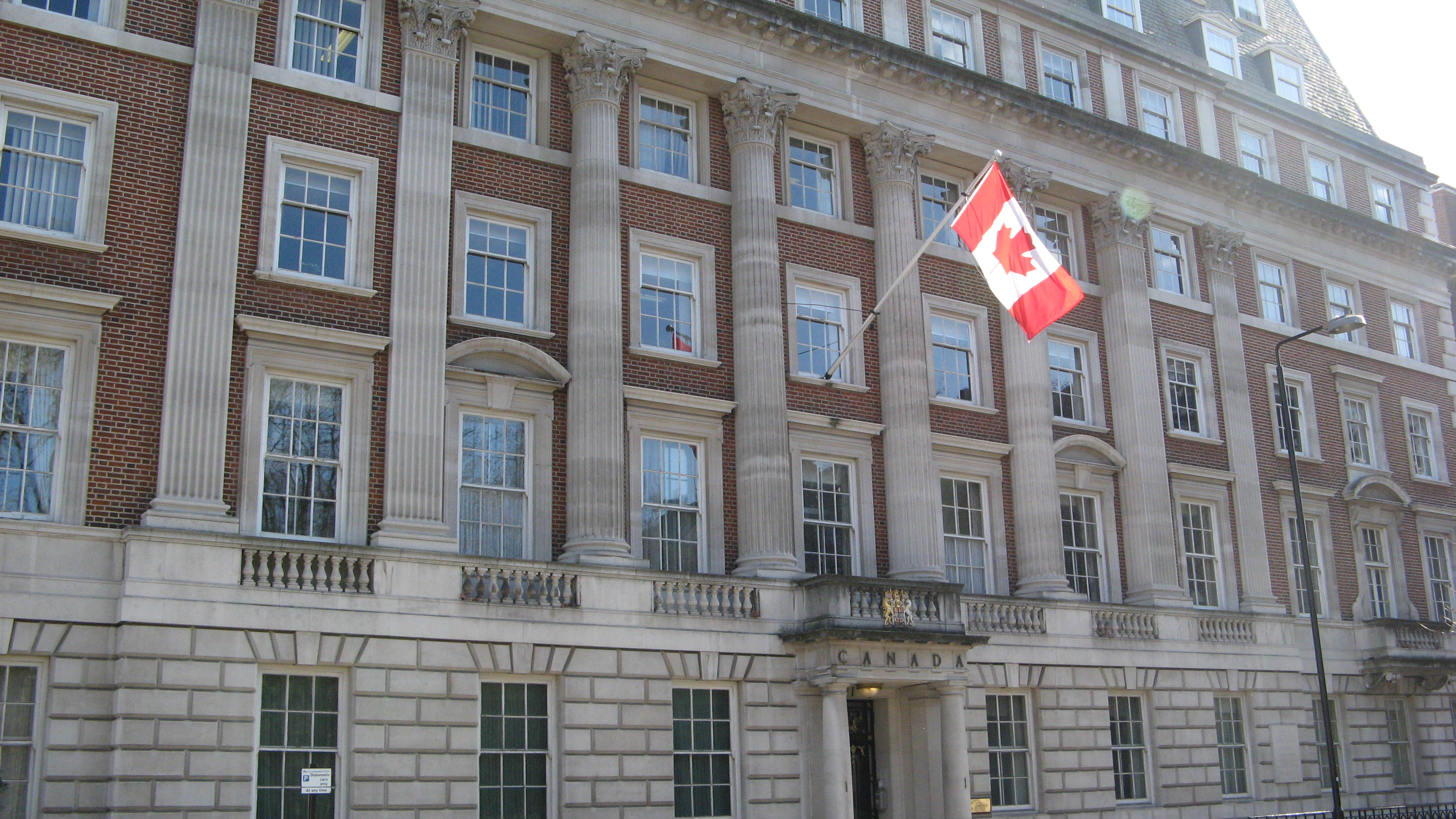
Macdonald House as seen in 2009. It has since been largely demolished (its facade front ls still preserved), but was the U.S. Embassy from 1938 to 1960, and then used by the High Commission of Canada from 1961 to 2014.

Grosvenor Square was long a centre of American presence in London beginning when John Adams established the first American mission to the Court of St. James's in 1785. Adams lived, from 1785 to 1788, in the house which still stands on the corner of Brook and Duke Streets.

During the Second World War American general Dwight D. Eisenhower established a military headquarters at 20 Grosvenor Square, and during this time the square was nicknamed "Eisenhower Platz". Until 2009, the United States Navy continued to use this building as its headquarters for United States Naval Forces Europe. A statue of wartime president Franklin D. Roosevelt sculpted by Sir William Reid Dick stands in the square, as does a later statue of Eisenhower, and a statue of president Ronald Reagan by Chas Fagan. The square also contains the Eagle Squadrons Memorial.

The former United States Embassy of 1938–1960 on the square was purchased by the Canadian government and renamed Macdonald House. It was part of the Canadian High Commission in London until 2014, when all the functions of the Canadian High Commission were transferred to Canada House in Trafalgar Square.

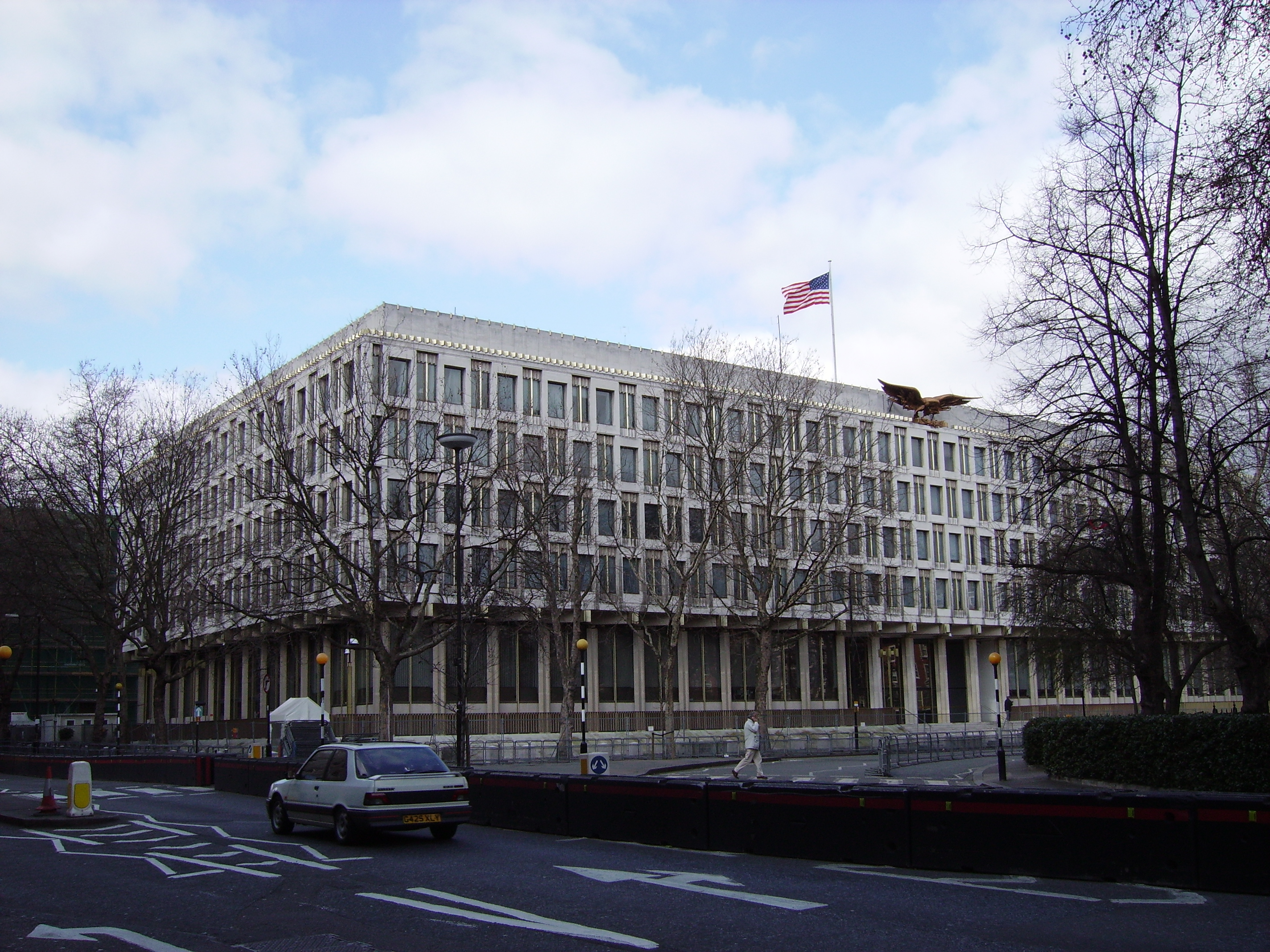
The Eero Saarinen designed former American embassy building (1960–2018) on the western side of Grosvenor Square is now a hotel

In 1960, a new United States Embassy was built on the western side of Grosvenor Square. This was a large and architecturally significant modern design by Eero Saarinen, being at the time a controversial insertion into a mainly Georgian and neo-Georgian district of London. In March and October 1968, there were large demonstrations in the square against US involvement in the Vietnam War. On both occasions, the protest became violent. After 2001 a series of anti-terrorist devices were installed around the embassy, and the road running along the front of the building was closed completely to traffic. In 2006, the Grosvenor Square Safety Group residents association took out advertisements in The Washington Post and The Times, accusing the Metropolitan Police and local government of a "moral failure" for not closing two other roads adjacent to the embassy.

In 2008, the United States Government chose a site for a new embassy in the Nine Elms area of the London Borough of Wandsworth, south of the River Thames. Construction of the new Embassy of the United States in London began in 2013, with relocation completed by 2017. In October 2009, following a recommendation by English Heritage, the Saarinen-designed building was granted Grade II listed status. The listing means that the new owners will not be allowed to change the facade, which includes the 35-foot-wingspread gilded-aluminium eagle that hovers above the main entrance. In November 2009, the Grosvenor Square property was purchased by the Qatari Diar investment group.

=== Adlai Stevenson ===
On 14 July 1965, while walking with Marietta Tree, the then-U.S. Ambassador to the United Nations, Adlai Stevenson, suffered a heart attack, later dying at the old St George's Hospital at Hyde Park Corner. As they reached the front of the Sportsman's Club, his last words were reportedly to ask her to slow down.

=== Oscar Wilde ===
The writer Oscar Wilde lived in Grosvenor Square between 1883 and 1884, and references to the square appear in four of his works (see section below).

=== Memorial to victims of 11 September 2001 ===
Since 2003, the east of the gardens has contained a memorial garden to 67 British victims of the 11 September 2001 terrorist attacks. The poem For Katrina's Sun-Dial by Henry van Dyke was chosen for inscription on an elliptical granite block engraved with the names of the victims, underneath which is buried a piece of the steel wreckage.

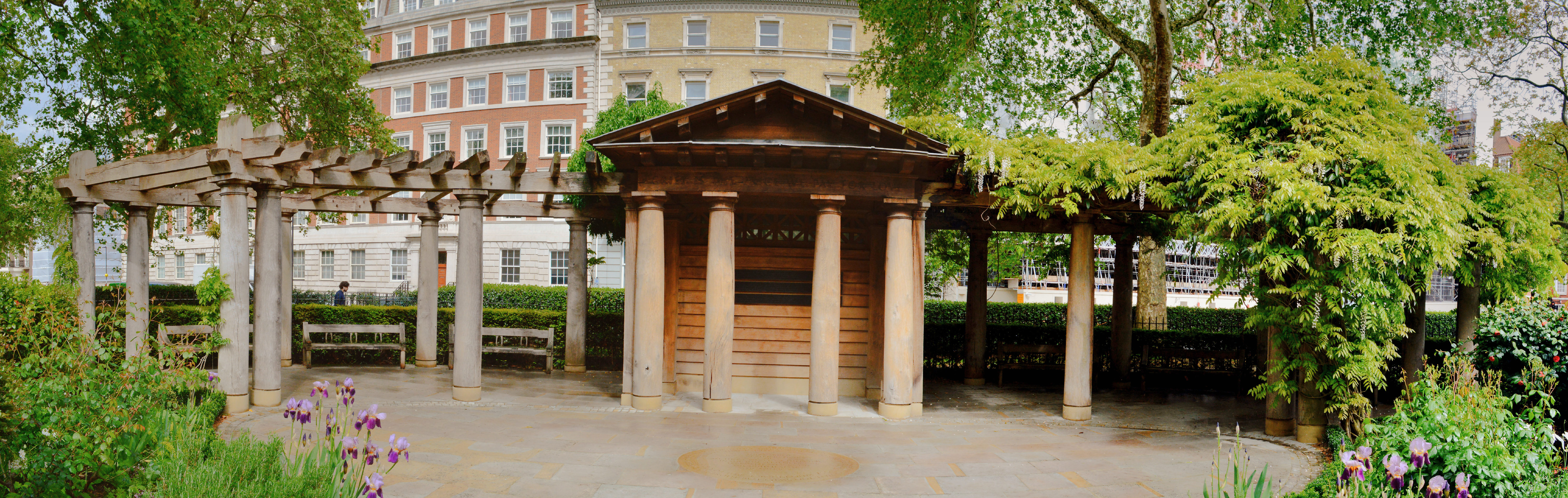
11 September 2001 memorial garden

=== Diplomatic property sell-off ===
The former United States Navy building at 20 Grosvenor Square was sold in 2007 for £250 million to Richard Caring, who planned to turn it into 41 residential apartments. The Abu Dhabi Investment Council and property developer Finchatton then bought the building for the same amount in April 2013, with planning permission to convert the building into 31 luxury apartments.

In September 2013, the Government of Canada announced its intention to sell its High Commission building at 1 Grosvenor Square and "consolidate its diplomatic activity in the UK in a single, central location in Canada House on Trafalgar Square".

== Notable buildings ==
Most of the buildings on Grosvenor Square are in the Georgian style of architecture.

- No. 1 – Macdonald House, formerly part of the High Commission of Canada, being redeveloped into high-end residences
- No. 4 – Back entrance to the Embassy of Italy
- No. 10 – London Marriott Hotel Grosvenor Square
- No. 20 – Former United States Navy building, being converted into upscale apartments
- No. 24 – Eero Saarinen-designed former location of the Embassy of the United States, being redeveloped by Rosewood Hotels into a luxury hotel designed by David Chipperfield
- No. 38 – Former Embassy of Indonesia, converted by Venue Lab into an event space
- No. 44 – The Biltmore Mayfair hotel, formerly the Millennium Hotel London Mayfair
- No. 47 - Former residence of Raine, Countess Spencer, during her first marriage to the Earl of Dartmouth.

== In popular culture ==
- Robert Hunter's lyrics for the Grateful Dead song "Scarlet Begonias" begin with the line "As I was walkin' 'round Grosvenor Square".
- It appears in the title of several novels including The Lonely Lady of Grosvenor Square by Mrs. Henry De La Pasture (1907), The Grosvenor Square Goodbye by Francis Clifford (1978), and The House in Grosvenor Square by Linore Rose Burkard (2009).
- In Little Dorrit by Charles Dickens, the Barnacles are said to live at "number twenty-four, Mews Street, Grosvenor Square" which "was not absolutely Grosvenor Square itself but it was very near it".
- In the 1960 Universal Pictures thriller Midnight Lace, Doris Day is terrorized in Grosvenor Square as she leaves the U.S. Embassy at 1 Grosvenor Square during a London "pea-soup" fog. As she crosses the square to her residence, an unseen voice near the statue of Franklin D. Roosevelt threatens to kill her before the month is out.
- Oscar Wilde makes frequent use of it as a location:
  - In the opening act in his play An Ideal Husband, the first scene is in "the octagon room at Sir Robert Chiltern's house in Grosvenor Square".
  - It is mentioned in his play The Importance of Being Earnest, when Lady Bracknell makes a comment about violence in Grosvenor Square because of the lower classes (or, depending on one's sense of humour, the upper classes) receiving education.
  - In his play Lady Windermere's Fan, the Duchess of Berwick says, "I think on the whole that Grosvenor Square would be a more healthy place to reside in. There are lots of vulgar people live in Grosvenor Square, but at any rate there are no horrid kangaroos crawling about."
  - Dorian Gray, the protagonist of his novel The Picture of Dorian Gray, lives in or close to Grosvenor Square.
- Alfred Sutro's one-act play A Marriage Has Been Arranged (1904) portrays a ball in "the Conservatory of No. 300 Grosvenor Square".
- Caroline Bingley makes a comment regarding the local dance in Pride and Prejudice "We are a long way from Grosvenor Square, are we not, Mr Darcy".
- It is used as a reference to the CIA's London office in the BBC spy drama Spooks.
- In Julia Quinn's novel The Duke and I – also published under the title Bridgerton – Grosvenor Square is the main setting for both the Bridgertons' and the Featheringtons' London homes. It is also featured in the Netflix series Bridgerton.
- Roy Harper sings the line "don't you think you could have taken Grandad and his medals And played a different game in Grosvenor Square" in his 1971 anti-war song "One Man Rock and Roll Band".
- The Savoyard in Grosvenor Square. is one of Letitia Elizabeth Landon's Scenes in London in Fisher's Drawing Room Scrap Book, 1836. In it a travelling orphan boy (the Savoyard) sings for his bread, only to be ignored by the wealthy gentry. He takes comfort at the sight of an orange tree, a reminder of nature and home.

== See also ==
- Protests of 1968
- List of eponymous roads in London
- Grosvenor Square, Dublin

== Bibliography ==
- Summerson, John (2003). Georgian London. Yale University Press. ISBN 978-0-300-08988-2.
- "Bentley Boys". Gear Wheels magazine. Archived from the original on 28 September 2007.
- Weinreb, Ben; Hibbert, Christopher; Keay, John; Keay, Julia, eds. (2008) [1983]. The London Encyclopaedia (Third ed.). Macmillan. ISBN 978-1-405-04924-5.
