= Embassy Gardens =

Development in London, England

Coordinates: 51.482°N 0.133°W

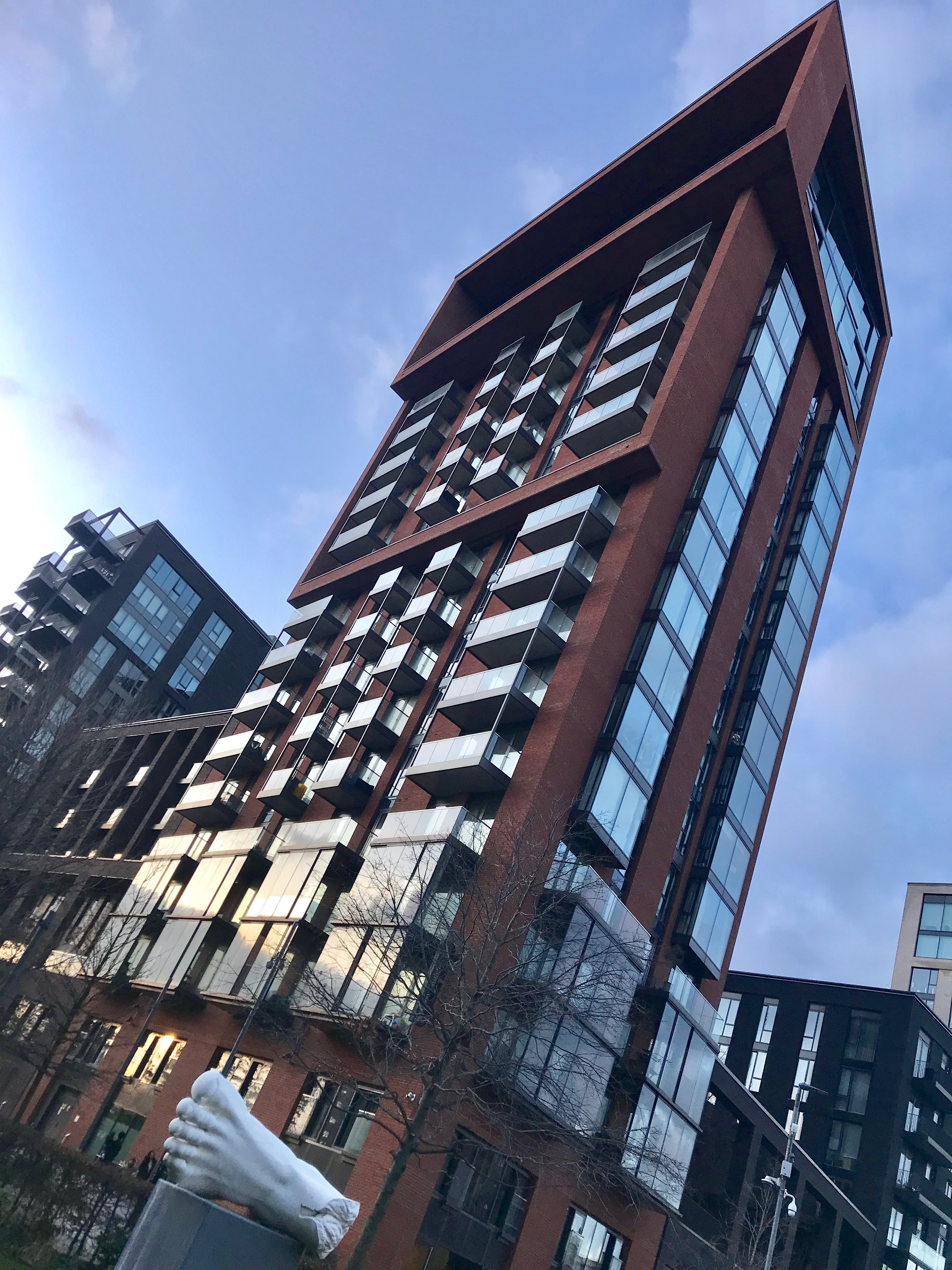
A block of flats in Embassy Gardens

Embassy Gardens is a residential and business development built by Ballymore Group in the Nine Elms regeneration zone in London, England, surrounding the United States Embassy building opened in 2017. It features the transparent Sky Pool for swimming, which is suspended 115 feet (35m) in the air between the development's prominent buildings.

On 16 February 2012, Wandsworth Council approved Ballymore Group's plans for the 15-acre development. Embassy Gardens was intended to provide "up to 1,982 new homes alongside shops, cafes, bars, restaurants, business space, a 100 bed hotel, a health centre, children's playgrounds and sports pitches".

In 2014, it was reported that Ballymore had engaged Lazard and CBRE Group to raise about €2.5bn to fund the Embassy Gardens development.

In June 2017, 25 apartments were released for sale by EcoWorld Ballymore with prices for the homes that overlook a sky pool starting at £1million. The outdoor swimming pool is suspended 10 storeys high and acts as a bridge between two apartment blocks. It enables residents to swim between two buildings with views of the London Eye and Westminster Palace.

The lead architects were Sara Grohmann and Alex Whitbread, of Feilden Clegg Bradley Studios.

In March 2021, Embassy Gardens residents were reported by the Financial Times as feeling "trapped" in their apartments, with one resident reporting that the service charge had increased 58% in five years to an annual charge of just over £6,500. This was an increase of between 10% and 15% per annum, well above the UK's inflation rate of 2.9% per annum during that period.

== Sky Pool ==
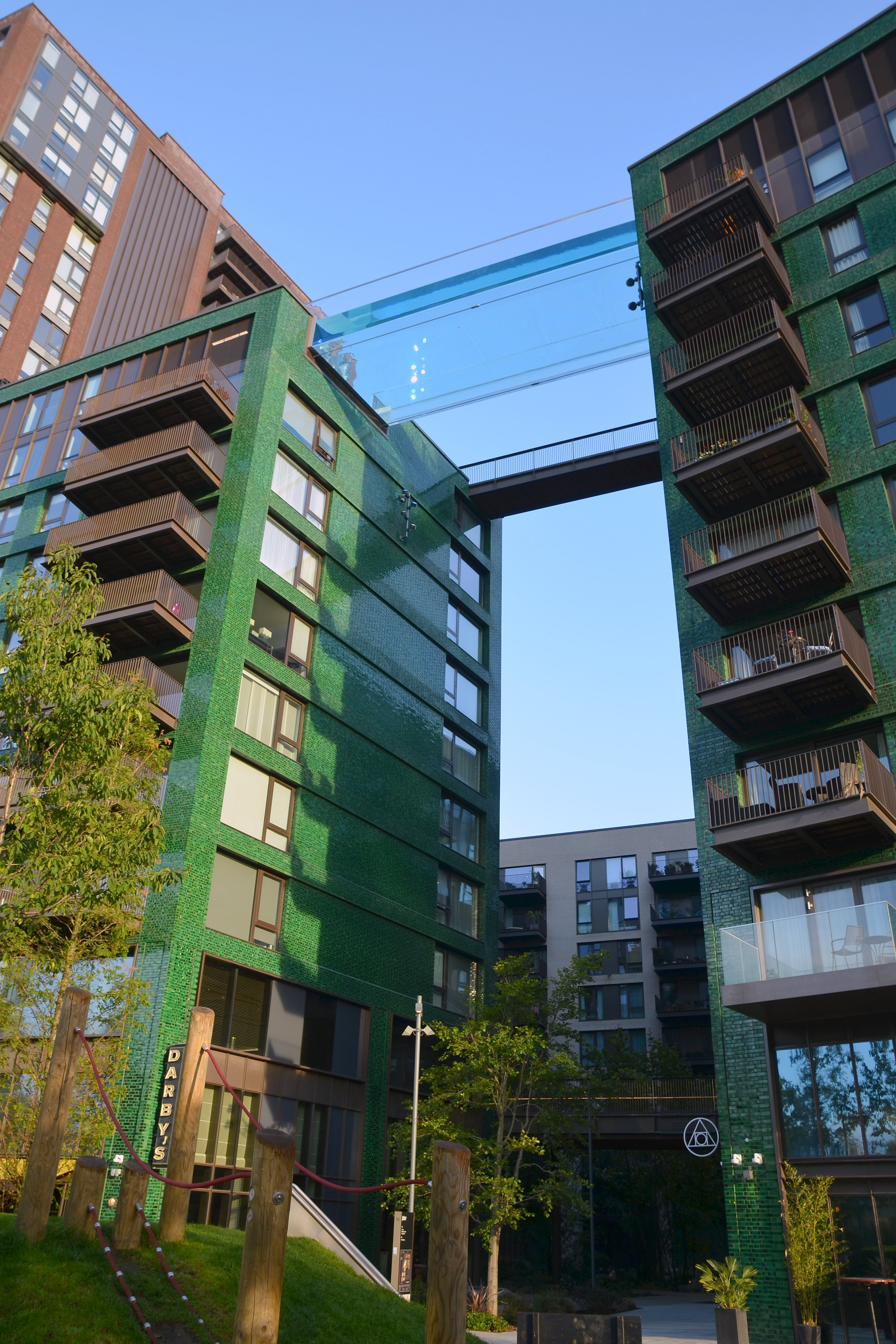
Embassy Gardens Phase 2 with the Sky Pool

The "Sky Pool" is a swimming pool that acts as a 14-metre (46 ft) bridge between two high-rise buildings at Embassy Gardens. It is 35 metres (115 ft) above the ground, and it was the first "floating pool" of its kind. It is for residents, and is not open to the general public.
