= L. Dana Wilgress =

Leolyn Dana Wilgress
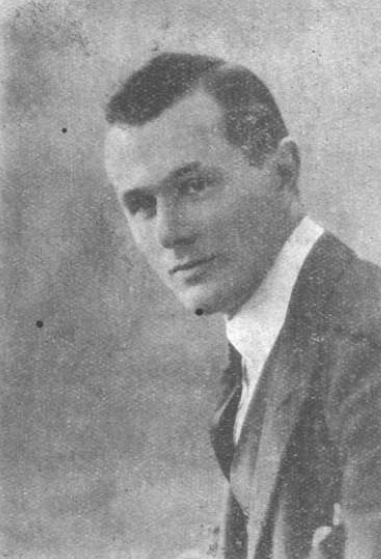

Canadian High Commissioner to the United Kingdom
- In office 1949–1952
- Prime Minister: Louis St. Laurent
- Preceded by: Norman Robertson
- Succeeded by: Norman Robertson

Personal details
- Born: October 20, 1892 Vancouver, British Columbia
- Died: July 21, 1969 (aged 76) Ottawa, Ontario
- Occupation: Diplomat
- Awards: Order of Canada

Leolyn Dana Wilgress, CC (October 20, 1892 – July 21, 1969) was a Canadian diplomat.

Born in Vancouver, British Columbia, to Henry T. and Helene M. (Empev), Wilgress was educated in Vancouver, Yokohama Japan, Victoria and at McGill University. He married Olga Buergin on June 4, 1919 and they had three children.

He was a Junior Trade Commissioner in 1914, Canadian Trade Commissioner, Omsk, Russia in 1916 and Trade Commissioner in Vladivostok in 1918. In early 1922, he was Trade Commissioner in Hamburg, Germany. He became Director of the Commercial Intelligence Service in Ottawa in 1932; was an adviser at the Ottawa Imperial Conference in 1932, an adviser at the World Economic Conference at London in 1933; a negotiator in Washington for Canada–U.S. Trade Agreement, 1936–1938. He was appointed Minister to the U.S.S.R. for the period 1942–1943.

He was Canadian ambassador to the USSR from 1944 to 1946, and High Commissioner to London from 1949 to 1952. From 1952 to 1953 he was Under-Secretary of State for External Affairs and Deputy Minister of Foreign Affairs. He was Ambassador and permanent representative to the North Atlantic Council of NATO from 1953 to 1958, and representative to the Organisation for Economic Co-operation and Development from 1953 to 1958.

In 1953 he received a Doctor of Laws, honoris causa from the University of British Columbia and in 1967 was made a Companion of the Order of Canada. Wilgress died in 1969, and was interred in the Capital Memorial Gardens in Ottawa.

Diplomatic posts
Preceded by Norman Robertson	Canadian High Commissioner to the United Kingdom; 1949–1952	Succeeded by Norman Robertson
