= Norman Robertson =

Canadian diplomat

Norman Alexander Robertson
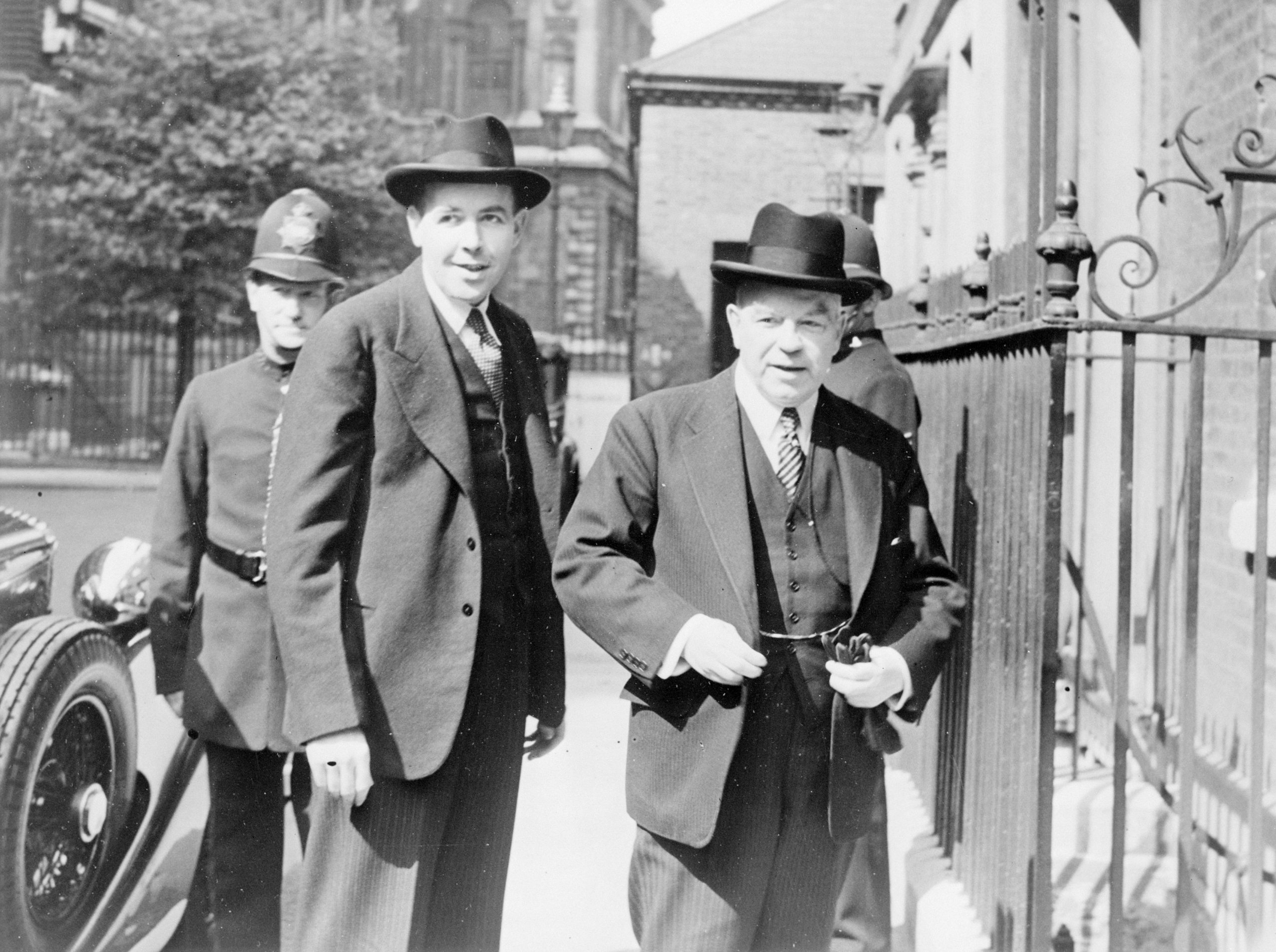
- Norman Robertson and Mackenzie King, 1944

Clerk of the Privy Council and Secretary to the Cabinet
- In office March 15, 1949 – May 31, 1952
- Preceded by: Arnold Heeney
- Succeeded by: Jack Pickersgill

Canadian High Commissioner to the United Kingdom
- In office 1946–1949
- Prime Minister: W.L. Mackenzie King; Louis St. Laurent
- Preceded by: Vincent Massey
- Succeeded by: L. Dana Wilgress
- In office 1952–1957
- Prime Minister: Louis St. Laurent; John Diefenbaker
- Preceded by: L. Dana Wilgress
- Succeeded by: George A. Drew

Personal details
- Born: March 4, 1904 Vancouver, British Columbia
- Died: July 16, 1968 (aged 64) Ottawa, Ontario
- Education: University of British Columbia; Balliol College, Oxford

Norman Alexander Robertson, CC (March 4, 1904 – July 16, 1968) was a Canadian diplomat and was one of Prime Minister Mackenzie King's advisers.

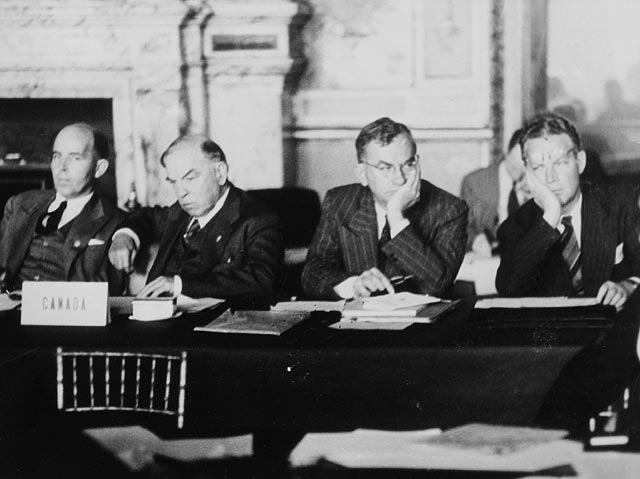
Norman Robertson and colleagues at the Paris Peace Conference, Palais du Luxembourg. (L.-r.:) Norman Robertson, Rt. Hon. W.L. Mackenzie King, Hon. Brooke Claxton, Arnold Heeney

== Background and early life ==
Born in Vancouver, British Columbia, he was educated at the University of British Columbia and was a Rhodes Scholar attending Balliol College, Oxford.

In 1929 he started with the Department of External Affairs.

== Senior diplomatic appointments ==
In 1941, he became Under Secretary of State for External Affairs.

From 1946 to 1949 and 1952 to 1957, he was Canadian High Commissioner in London, during which time he participated at the Coronation of Queen Elizabeth II as Standard Bearer, and from 1957 to 1958 he was Canadian Ambassador in Washington, D.C.

== Honours; death ==
In 1967, he was made a Companion of the Order of Canada. Robertson is buried at Maclaren Cemetery in Wakefield, Quebec. Robertson is buried at the same cemetery as fellow diplomats and friends Hume Wrong and Lester B. Pearson.

Diplomatic posts
Preceded by Vincent Massey	Canadian High Commissioner to the United Kingdom; 1946–1949	Succeeded by L. Dana Wilgress
Preceded by L. Dana Wilgress	Canadian High Commissioner to the United Kingdom; 1952–1957	Succeeded by George Drew
