= Market Square Tower =

Apartment building in Houston, Texas

Coordinates: 29°45′46.4″N 95°21′48.4″W

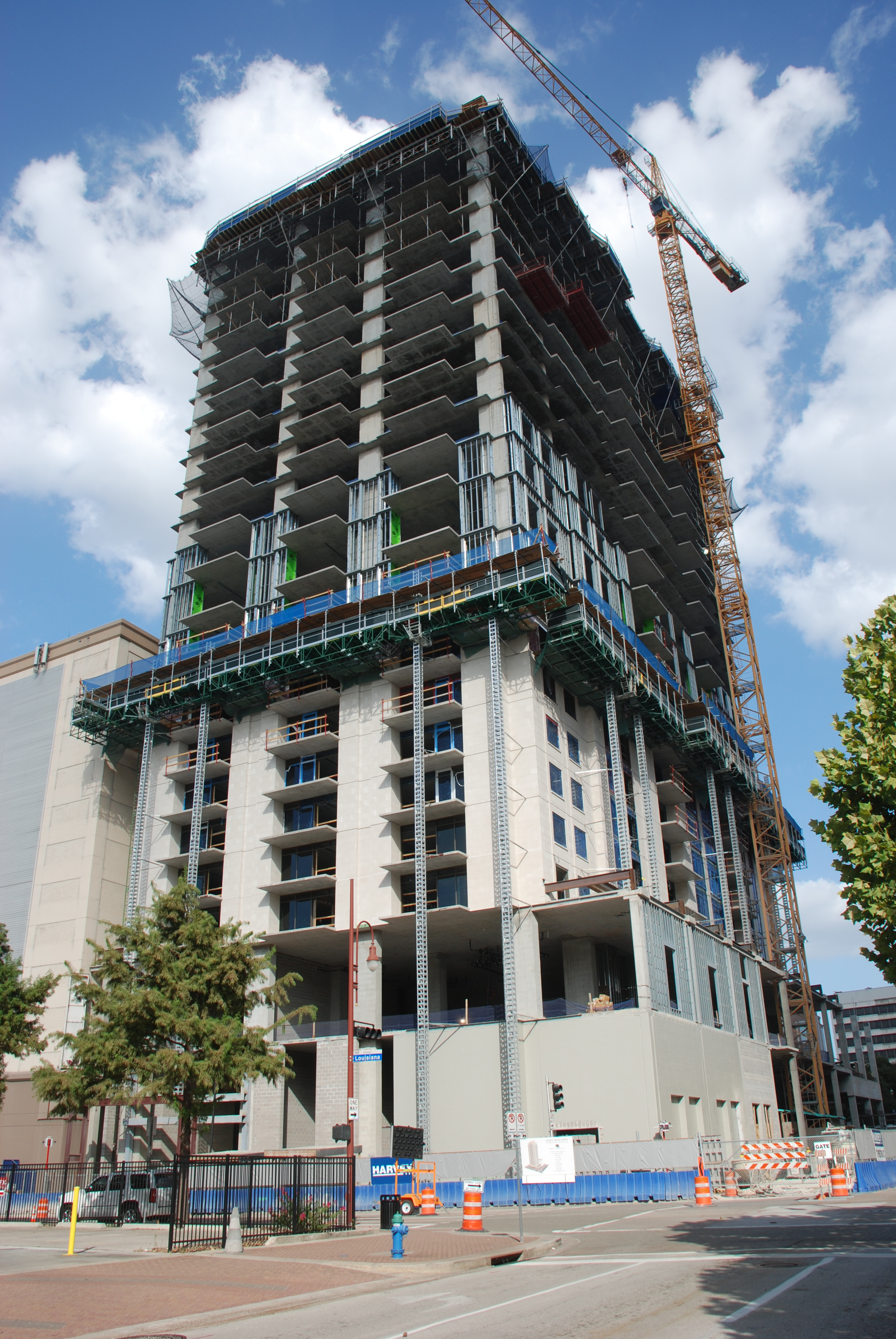
Market Square Tower under construction in 2015

Market Square Tower is a residential high rise in downtown Houston, Texas, USA. It is 502 feet (153 m) with 40 floors and 463 apartments. The building began construction in 2014 and was completed in early 2017. At the time of groundbreaking, the building was the largest residential building in downtown in number of units and floors. The building is noted for a glass bottom pool that protrudes from the side of the building near the top, known as the Sky Pool. The pool, which cantilevers about 10 feet (3.0 m) over the edge, is the highest pool in Texas.

== See also ==
- List of tallest buildings in Houston
