= Macdonald House, London =

Building on Grosvenor Square in Mayfair, London, England

Coordinates: 51.5115°N 0.1498°W

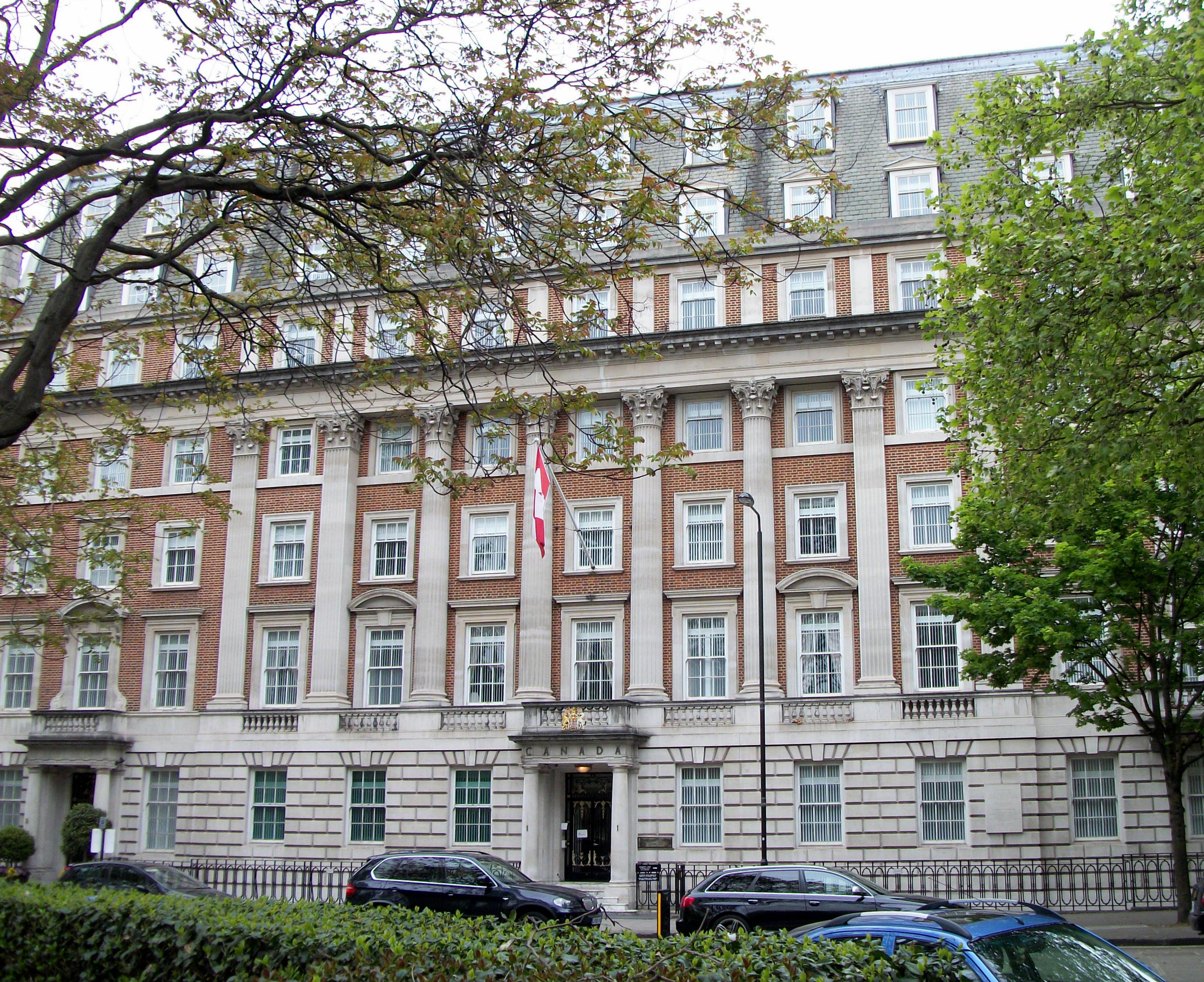
Macdonald House in 2012

Macdonald House was a seven-storey Neo-Georgian style building on Grosvenor Square in the Mayfair area of London, England. It was part of the High Commission of Canada from 1961 to 2014. Macdonald House was used for the High Commission's cultural and consular functions, trade and administrative sections, immigration section, and as the High Commissioner's official residence. From 1938 to 1960, the building was the Embassy of the United States.

The Government of Canada sold Macdonald House to a property developer in 2013 and vacated the building in 2014. Subsequently, Macdonald House was converted into a high-end residential building named №1 Grosvenor Square.

== History ==
In 1936, the former (residential) buildings on the site were demolished as part of a redevelopment scheme led by the Duke of Westminster. A new building was built and occupied numbers 1 to 3 on the eastern side of the square.

The American embassy moved into the building in 1938. During the Second World War, when the U.S. embassy was on one side and U.S. General Dwight D. Eisenhower's headquarters on another, Grosvenor Square became popularly known as "Little America", or "Eisenhowerplatz" (this last, Germanic, form was a joke about Eisenhower's German-origin name). After a new Modernist style building at 24 Grosvenor Square (designed by Eero Saarinen) was completed in 1960, the American embassy moved to that site.

The building was then acquired by the Canadian government and renamed Macdonald House in honour of Canada's first prime minister, Sir John A. Macdonald. It was re-opened by the Canadian High Commission on Dominion Day (1 July), 1961.

In December 2008, the Government of Canada revived previous plans to sell Macdonald House and purchase a building closer to Canada House on Trafalgar Square. In February 2010, the government of Prime Minister Stephen Harper cancelled the sale for the third time.

On 20 December 2010, the Department of Foreign Affairs and International Trade announced that Canada House, the High Commission's diplomatic, public and educational space in London, would close to undergo necessary renovations. It re-opened in 2012.

== Sale and redevelopment ==
On 28 November 2013, the Canadian government announced that Macdonald House had been sold to an India-based developer (Lodha Group) for $530 million. The building was vacated in mid-December 2014, when all the services of the High Commission were regrouped in the expanded and refurbished Canada House on Trafalgar Square.

Indian property developer Lodha Group then began redeveloping the property. The project involved the demolition of Macdonald House and disassembly of its facade, which was to be rebuilt to become the facade of the new building. The developer is recreating the Neo-Georgian architecture of Macdonald House in a new, high-end residential building called No.1 Grosvenor Square.

== Gallery ==
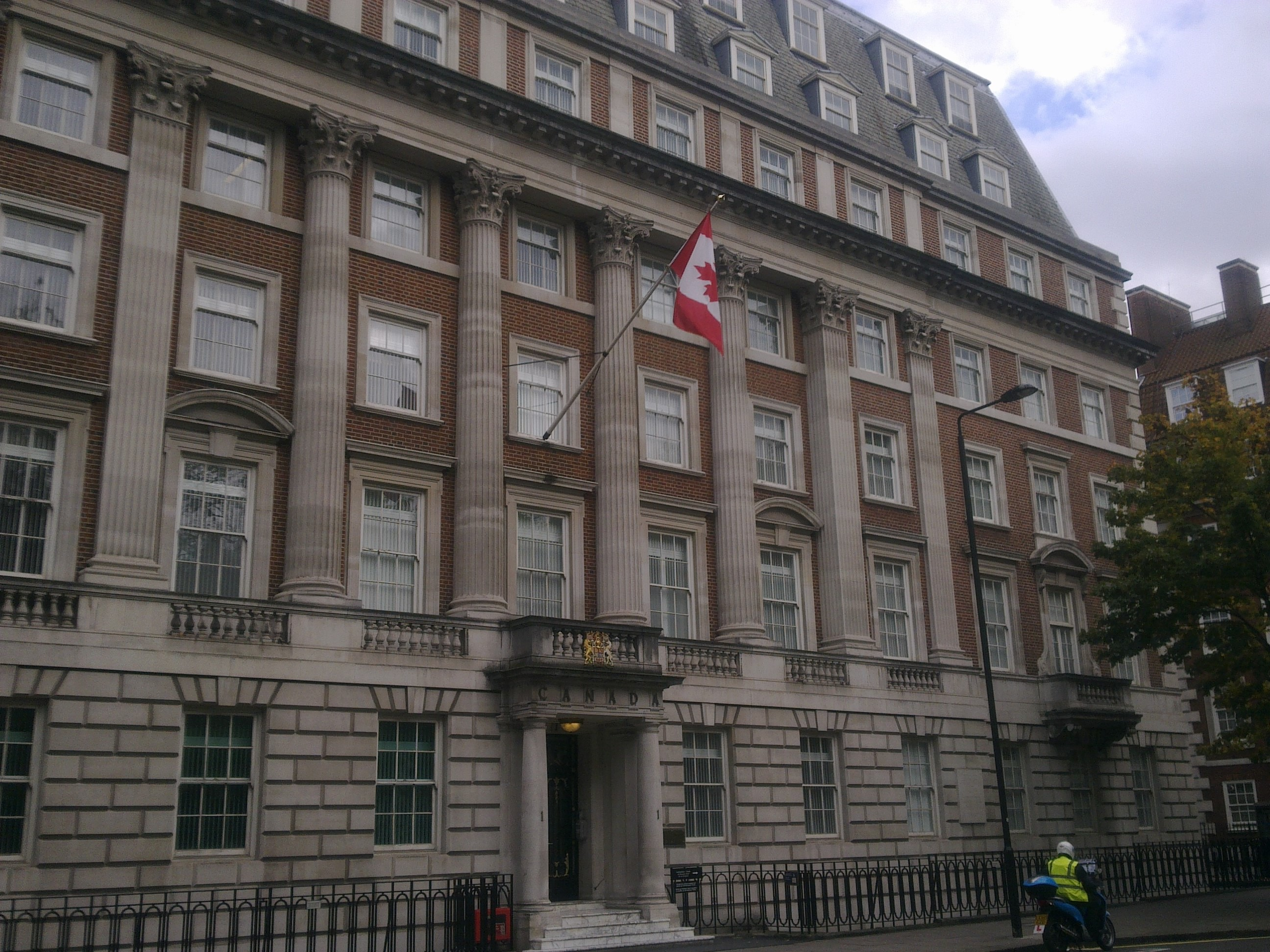
Macdonald House in 2013

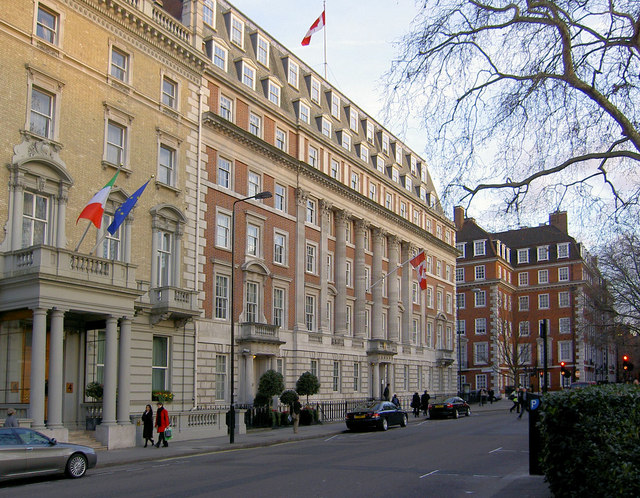
View of the building and the back entrance of the Embassy of Italy

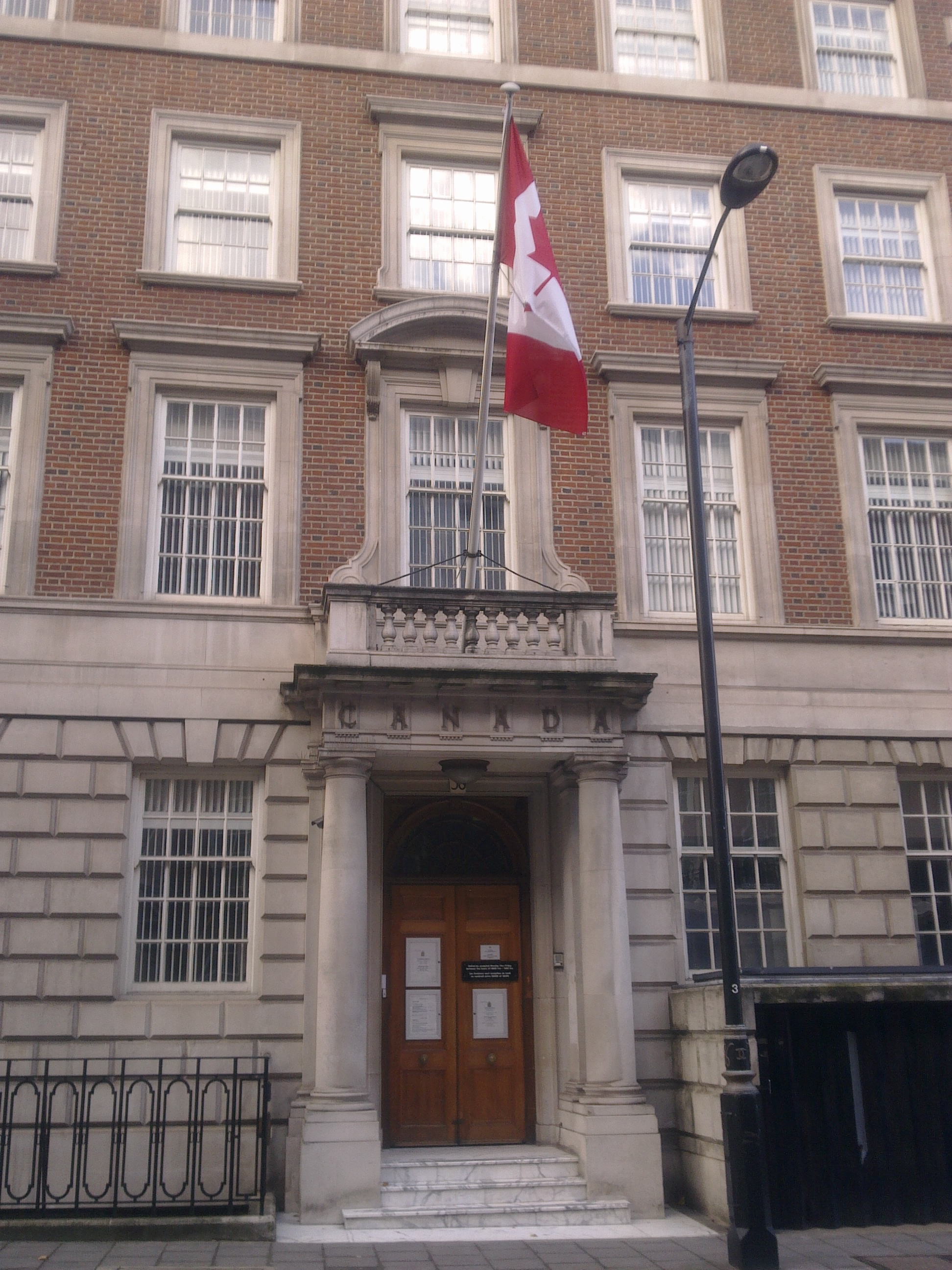
A side entrance to Macdonald House on Grosvenor Street

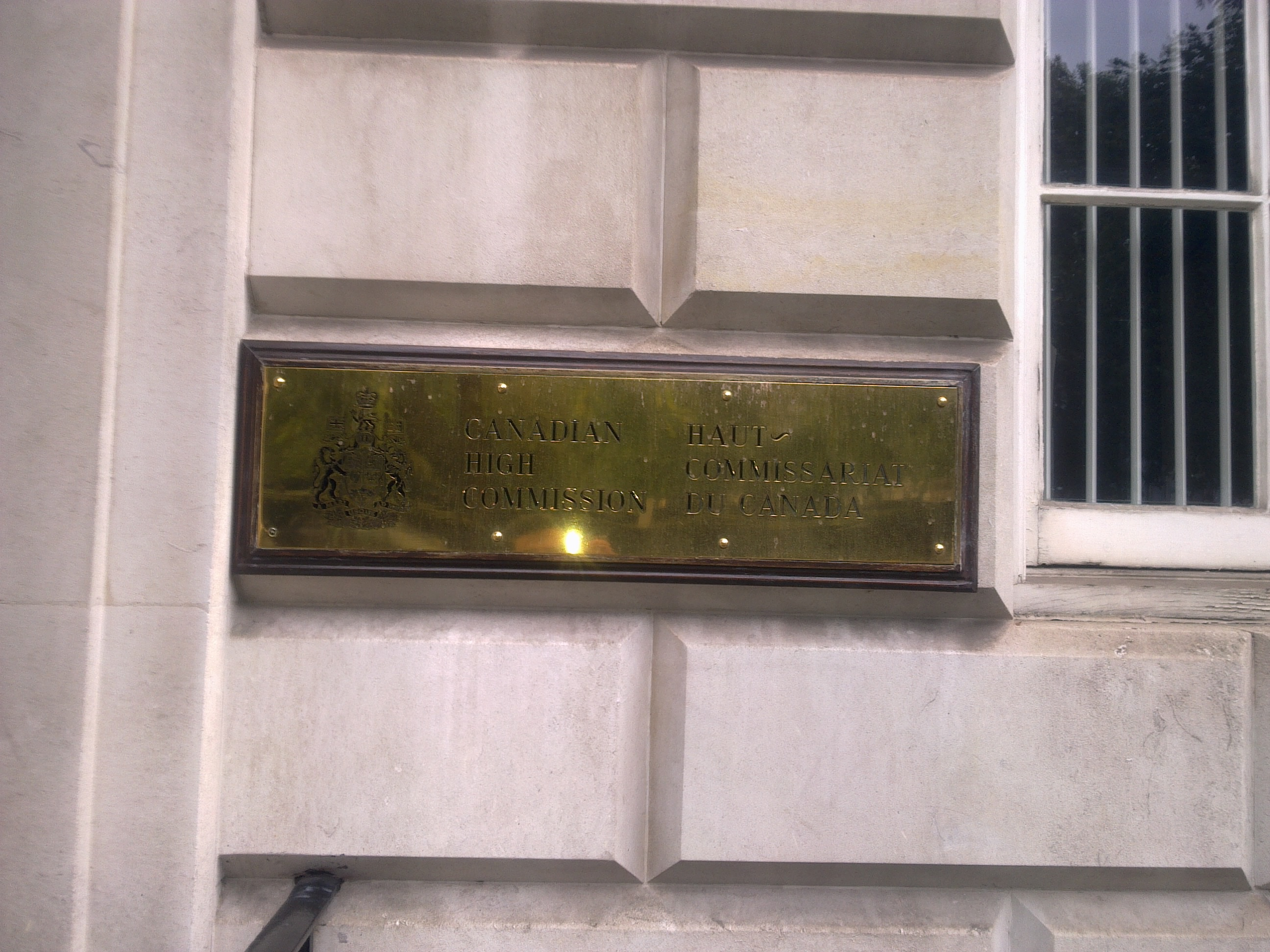
Plaque outside in English and French
