= Sky Pool, Houston =

Pool suspended 500 feet above the ground in Houston, Texas, United States

Coordinates: 29°45′46.4″N 95°21′48.4″W

Sky Pool is a swimming pool in Houston, Texas, United States. Constructed on top (42nd floor) of the Market Square Tower apartment complex, it is billed as the "tallest" pool in Texas. The pool extends out 10 feet (3 m) past the building into the air; this portion is made of 8-inch (20 cm) thick plexiglas so swimmers can view the city below from 500 feet (150 m) above the ground. It is supported by two concrete cantilevers, one on each side. The tower and pool, finished in November 2016, were designed by Jackson and Ryan Architects.
