= High Commission of Canada, London =

Diplomatic mission of Canada in the United Kingdom

Coordinates: 51.5079°N 0.1294°W

High Commission of Canada in the United Kingdom Haut-commissariat du Canada au Royaume-Uni
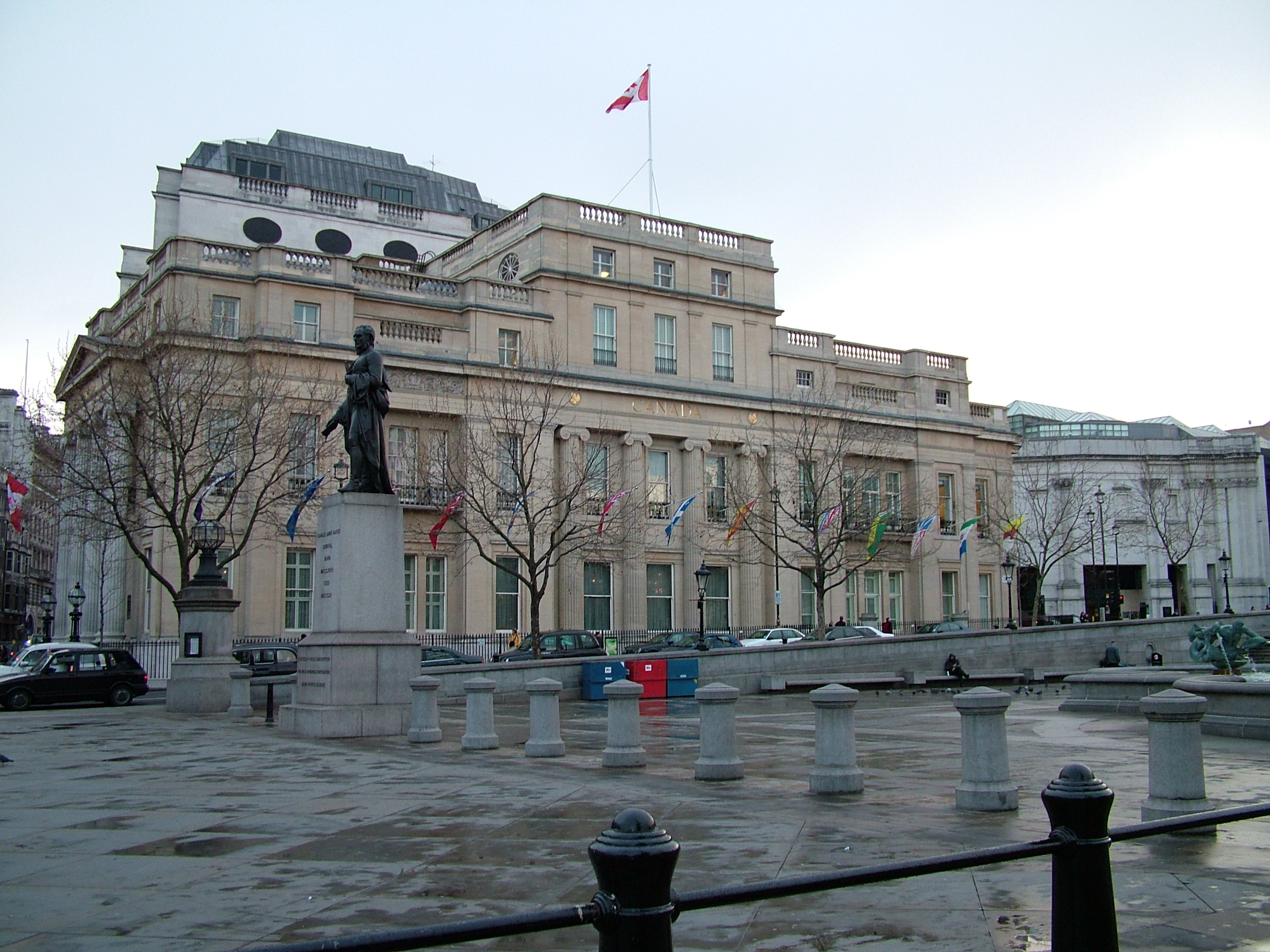
- Canada House in 2004
- Location: London, England
- Address: Trafalgar Square
- Jurisdiction: United Kingdom
- High Commissioner: William Blair
- Website: Official website

The High Commission of Canada in the United Kingdom (French: Haut-commissariat du Canada au Royaume-Uni) is the diplomatic mission of Canada to the United Kingdom. It is housed at Canada House on Trafalgar Square in central London.

== History ==
The Canadian high commission in London is Canada's oldest diplomatic posting, having been established in 1880. Canada House, in Trafalgar Square, became the site of the mission in 1923. In 1962, Canada also acquired the former American Embassy at 1, Grosvenor Square in London's Mayfair district, and it was renamed Macdonald House. Macdonald House was the official residence of the Canadian High Commissioner until the building was vacated in mid-December 2014, after having been sold for redevelopment.

Canada's presence in London goes back to 1869, when Sir John Rose, 1st Baronet was appointed as Canada's informal representative in Britain. This was the first Canadian diplomatic posting and the first from any British colony to the United Kingdom. Since Canada did not have a foreign ministry, Rose acted as the personal representative of Canada's prime minister, Sir John A. Macdonald. Rose's position was retained despite a change of government in Canada, and his position was given the title "Financial Commissioner for the Dominion of Canada". Additionally, in 1874, the government of Prime Minister Alexander Mackenzie named Edward Jenkins as Canada's Agent-General in London. Jenkins, a British Liberal Party Member of Parliament in the House of Commons of the United Kingdom, had grown up in Quebec. His duties in that role were clarified to the House of Commons of Canada in May 1874 by Canadian Prime Minister Alexander Mackenzie, who said that Jenkins would have surveillance of the Canadian emigration business in London and occasionally be asked to attend to other business of a confidential nature. In addition, he would be "expected to give some little attention to Canadian gentlemen sojourning in London". Jenkins held the post for two years. Mackenzie then appointed former Nova Scotia premier William Annand as agent general in 1876; he held the position until Mackenzie's government was defeated.

When Macdonald returned to power in 1878, he wanted to elevate the office of Financial Commissioner to "resident minister", but this was disallowed by Britain, who offered the title of high commissioner instead. This was the origin of the practice, which continues to this day, whereby members of the Commonwealth send high commissioners rather than ambassadors to each other.

The first official high commissioner was Alexander Tilloch Galt, appointed in 1880. The office remained the most important in Canadian diplomacy until well after World War Two, and was generally filled by political appointees rather than career diplomats.

As the high commission's role grew, it needed to expand its facilities, and on 29 June 1925, King George V and Queen Mary officiated at the dedication of Canada House on Trafalgar Square. The mission's needs continued to expand, however, and Canada acquired the former American embassy on Grosvenor Square, renaming it Macdonald House, in honour of Canada's first prime minister. Macdonald House opened on Canada Day (1 July) in 1961.

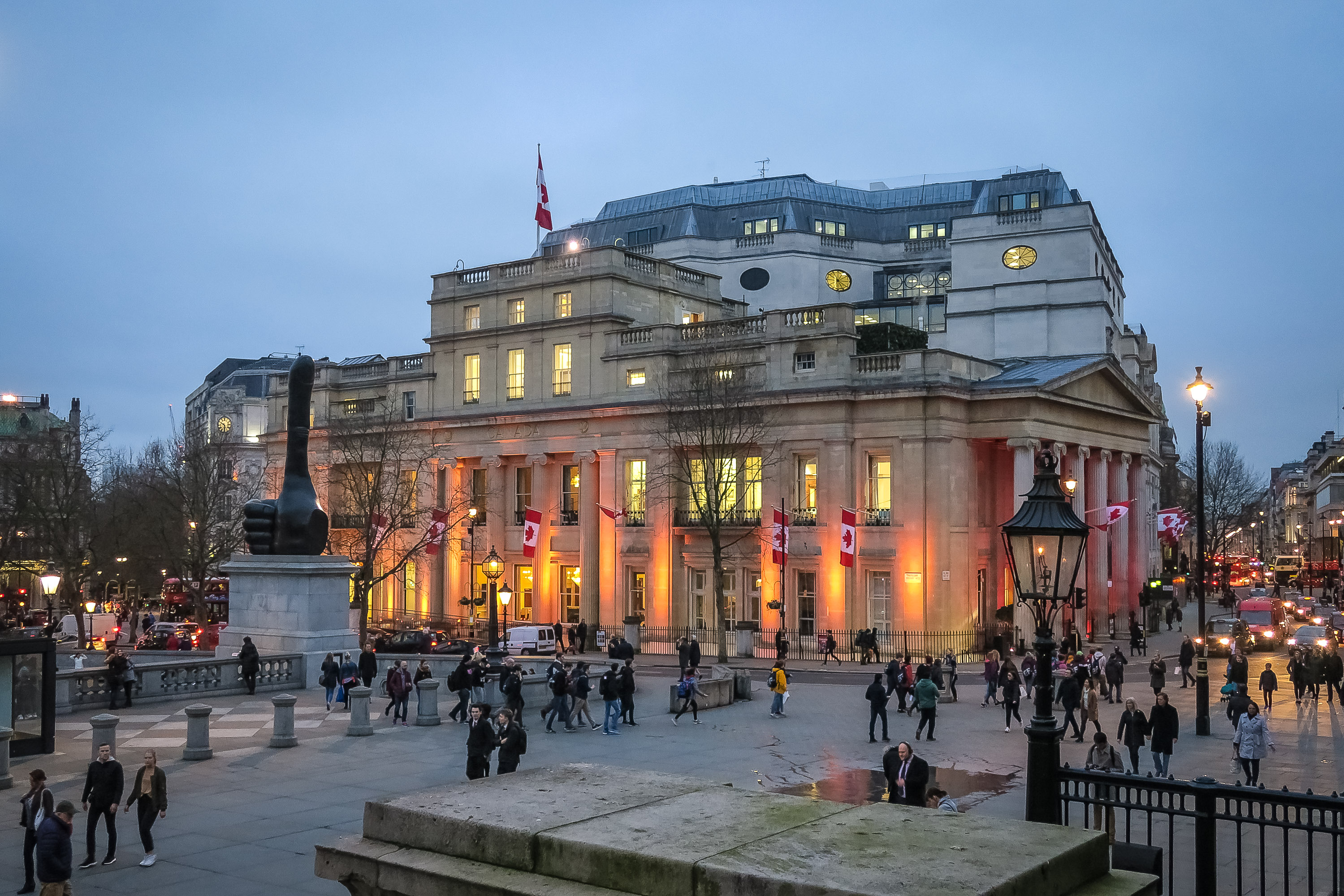
Evening view of Canada House

Canada House was refurbished in 1997–98. After years of operating from two buildings, in mid-December 2014, all the activities of the High Commission were regrouped in the expanded and fully refurbished Canada House on Trafalgar Square. In order to expand the historic Canada House, the Government of Canada had purchased the adjoining building at 2-3-4 Cockspur Street, originally built as the British head office of the Sunlife Assurance Company of Canada in 1927. It is remarkable that the Sunlife building had been built to match the architecture of Canada House. For that reason, it does look, from the outside, as if the building was built from the start as an extension of Canada House, although this is not the case. The historic Canada House and the former Sunlife head office now form a very coherent ensemble.

== List of heads of mission ==
Representative of the prime minister/ Financial commissioner of the Dominion of Canada	Start of term	End of term
Sir John Rose, 1st Baronet	1869	1880
Agent-General	Start of term	End of term
Edward Jenkins	1874	1876
William Annand	1876	1878
High Commissioner	Start of term	End of term
The Hon. Sir Alexander Tilloch Galt	1880	1883
The Rt. Hon. Sir Charles Tupper	1883	1896
The Rt. Hon. Donald Alexander Smith, 1st Baron Strathcona and Mount Royal	1896	1914
The Rt. Hon. Sir George Perley	1914	1922
The Hon. Peter C. Larkin	1922	1930
Lucien Turcotte Pacaud (acting)	1930	1930
The Hon. Howard Ferguson	1930	1935
The Rt. Hon. Vincent Massey	1935	1946
Norman Robertson	1946	1949
L. Dana Wilgress	1949	1952
Norman Robertson (second time)	1952	1957
The Hon. George Drew	1957	1964
The Hon. Lionel Chevrier	1964	1967
Charles Ritchie	1967	1971
Jake Warren	1971	1974
The Rt. Hon. Paul Martin Sr.	1974	1979
Jean Casselman Wadds	1979	1983
The Hon. Donald Jamieson	1983	1985
Roy McMurtry	1985	1988
The Hon. Donald Stovel Macdonald	1988	1991
Fredrik S. Eaton	1991	1994
The Hon. Royce Frith	1994	1996
The Hon. Roy MacLaren	1996	2000
Jeremy Kinsman	2000	2002
Mel Cappe	2002	2006
James R. Wright	2006	2011
Gordon Campbell	2011	2016
Janice Charette	2016	2021
The Hon. Ralph Goodale	2021	2025
The Hon. William Blair	2026	

== Gallery ==
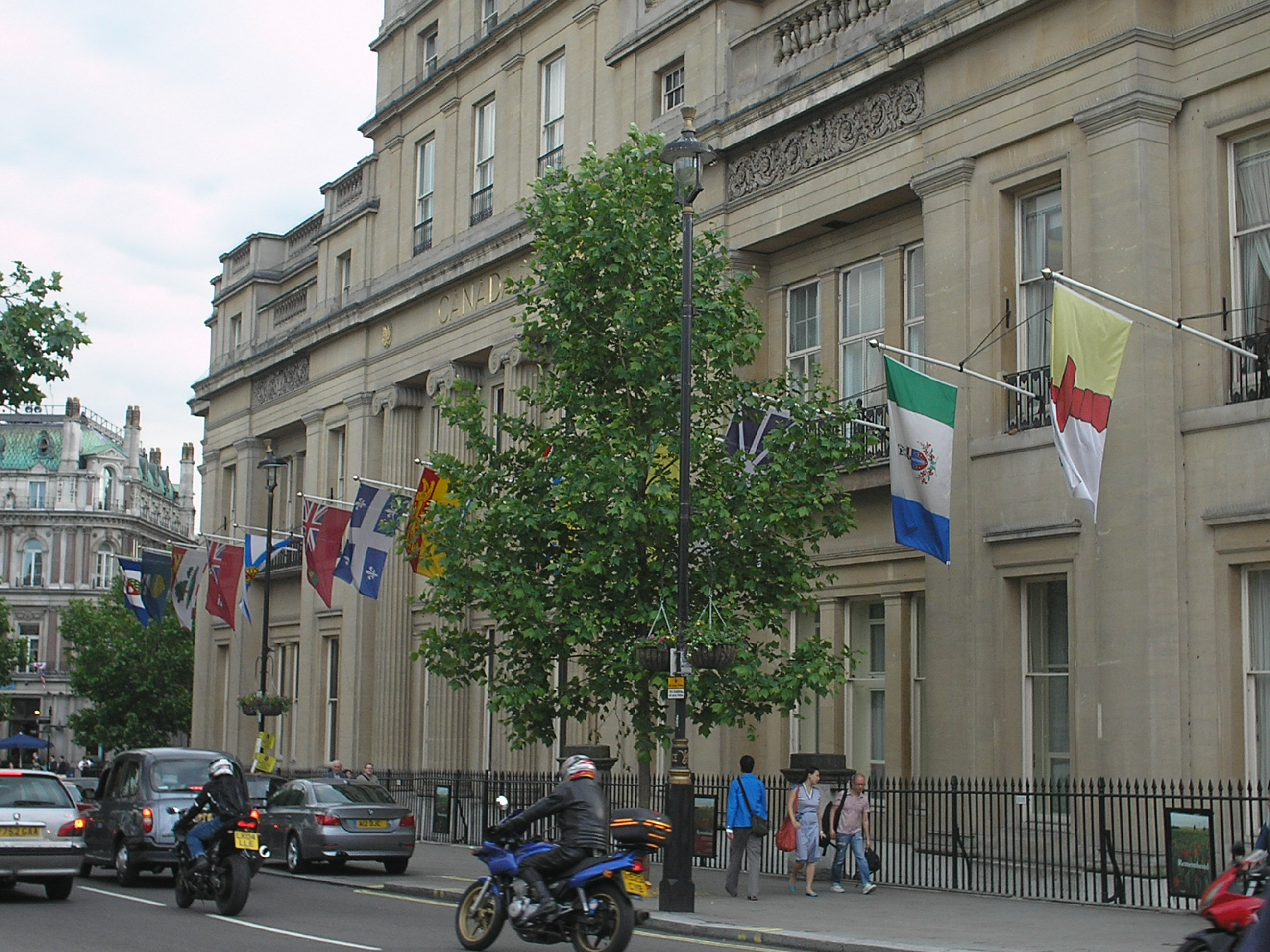
Canada House on Trafalgar Square

== See also ==
- British High Commission, Ottawa
- Canada House
- Canada–United Kingdom relations
- Macdonald House, London
