= Sky Pool, London =

Swimming pool bridging two buildings

Coordinates: 51.4820°N 0.1310°W

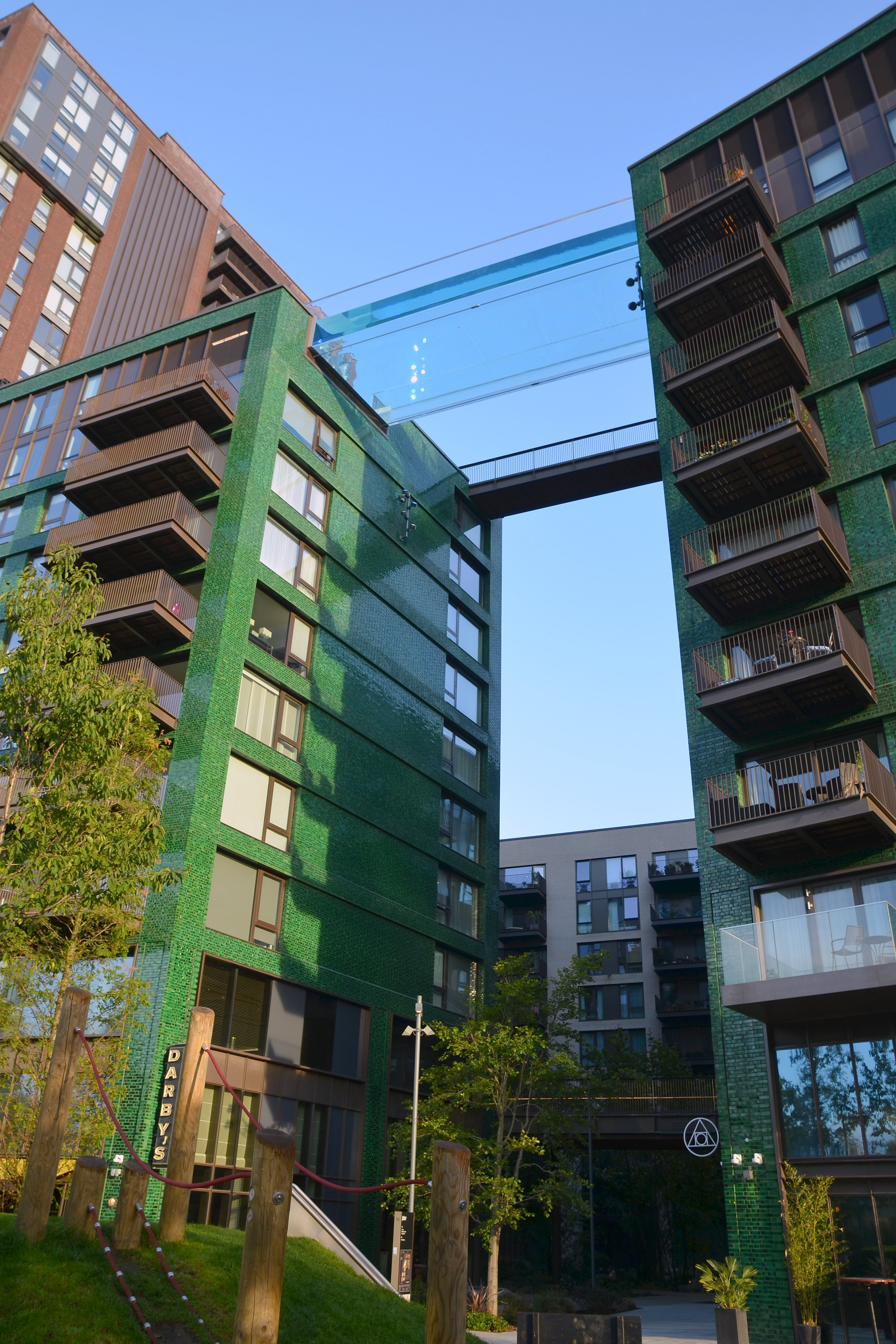
A view of the Sky Pool from ground level

The Sky Pool is a swimming pool at the Embassy Gardens development in the Nine Elms region of Wandsworth, a borough of southwest London. It is suspended 115 feet (35 m) above the ground and forms a bridge between two tall apartment buildings. Unveiled in May 2021.

== Location ==
The pool is situated in the Embassy Gardens development in the Nine Elms region of Wandsworth. It was built by EcoWorld Ballymore. The pool is the world's first "floating" swimming pool, and bridges a gap between two high-rise apartment buildings in the development. It is suspended 115 feet (35 m) above the ground. The pool is situated on the Sky Deck of the development and is only accessible to members of the EG:le Club for residents at Embassy Gardens. The Sky Deck also features a spa, orangery, and bar. The pool is not accessible to shared-ownership residents of Embassy Gardens.

== Design ==
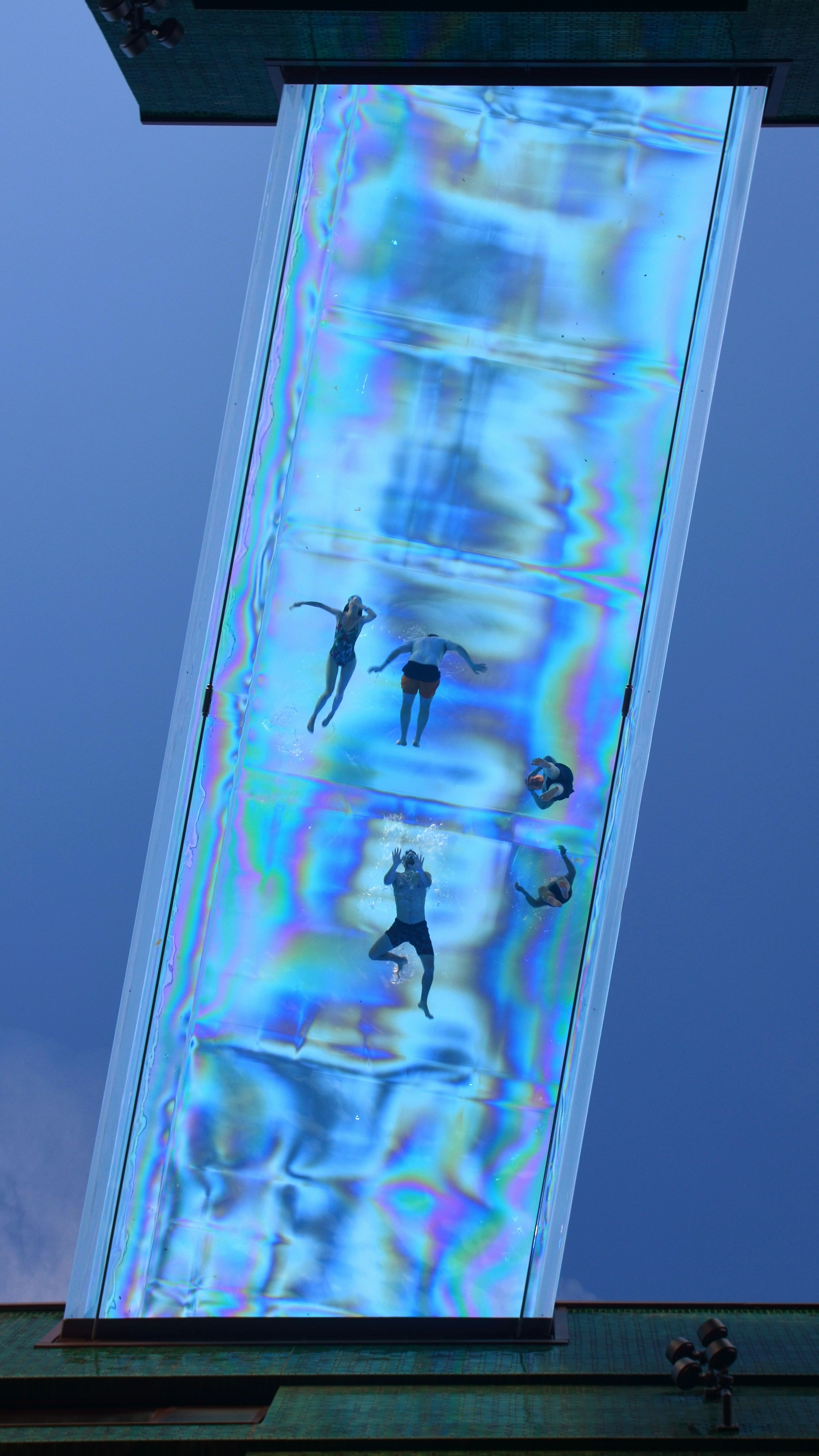
View from under the Sky Pool taken with a polarised lens showing the stress-induced birefringence of partially polarised skylight

Extending between the two Legacy buildings of the Embassy Gardens development, the pool is heated and is 82 feet (25 m) in length; it is the middle 45-foot (14 m) section of the pool that is suspended. The roof area was not large enough to accommodate a pool, and so the concept of the "floating pool" was developed. The suspended design of the pool is considered essential to preserve its large size without losing any additional floor space on the roof of the building. Steps into the pool and filtration systems are situated at either end of the pool. Architectural Digest wrote that the pool is believed to be the "world's largest single piece of load-bearing acrylic". The acrylic frame weighs 50 tonnes (49 long tons; 55 short tons); it is 8 inches (200 mm) thick with a 12-inch (300 mm) thick base and is nearly 10 feet (3.0 m) in depth, resting on an invisible steel frame. The structure that forms the pool was fabricated in the United States, in Colorado, by acrylic engineers Reynolds Polymer, Inc., and shipped from Texas in a three-week journey. It was designed by the structural engineers Eckersley O’Callaghan and HAL Architects.

== Reception ==
The pool opened to residents of Embassy Gardens on 19 May 2021. The opening ceremony was hosted by broadcaster Roman Kemp and featured a performance by Aquabatix, a synchronised swimming team. A short clip taken by a BBC News helicopter of people in the pool was viewed 10 million times.

The architecture critic Oliver Wainwright, writing in The Guardian, described the pool as a "miraculous world first" and a "liquid blue block suspended against the sky" that had the "gravity-defying quality" of a painting by René Magritte. Jessica Cherner, writing in Architectural Digest, felt that the transparency of the pool "mak[es] it appear like a rectangular glass box floating in mid-air".

=== Sociological critiques ===
Wainwright critiqued the pool as "a fantastical aquarium of captive high net worth individuals for the rest of us to gawp at from far below". Writing for Bloomberg News, in an article entitled "This Swimming Pool in the Sky Is the Ultimate Symbol of London's Affordability Crisis", Kriston Capps felt that the pool "secures an ultra-elite experience at the cost of casually insulting a city in the grips of an affordable-housing crisis" and that "there is a risk that comes with giving profligate wealth physical form and insisting on its transparency. It’s easy to imagine an excessively, aggressively exclusionary amenity becoming a focal point for anger over London’s extreme income inequality and affordable housing, at a time when activism on these topics is growing more intense". Capps described the pool as an "impossibly wondrous amenity" and a "jewel in plain sight of all but out of reach to almost everyone" and the developers have "[dangled] a potent symbol of inequality over all of London's heads". Writing for the New Statesman, Anoosh Chakelian felt the pool was a "compelling visible symbol of the housing inequality and uneven housebuilding rampant in the capital".

The urban studies academic Rowland Atkinson described the pool as a "cyclopean wet lens" in his 2021 book, Alpha City, and felt that the rooftop garden of Embassy Gardens "emphatically express[ed] the occupation of the city by a global, free-floating capitalist class".
