= A Marriage Has Been Arranged =

1904 play by Alfred Sutro

A Marriage Has Been Arranged (1904) is a one-act play by British author and dramatist Alfred Sutro.

The play premiered at the Garrick Theatre, in London, on March 27, 1904, with Arthur Bourchier playing the role of Mr. Harrisson Crockstead and Violet Vanbrugh as Lady Aline de Vaux.

The play presents a single scene in which Mr. Crockstead, a self-made millionaire, proposes marriage to the noble but pennyless young Lady Aline de Vaux, who refuses to marry him but eventually changes her mind after Crockstead makes the girl a strange, unusual offer. It is classified as a comedy of society.
