= Street names of Bloomsbury =

This is a list of the etymology of street names in the London district of Bloomsbury. The following utilises the generally accepted boundaries of Bloomsbury viz. Euston Road to the north, Gray's Inn Road to the east, New Oxford Street, High Holborn, Southampton Row and Theobald's Road to the south and Tottenham Court Road to the west.

Several streets are named for members of the Russell family, Dukes of Bedford and Marquesses of Tavistock, who owned land here in the 18th century.

- Adeline Place – after Adeline Marie Russell, Duchess of Bedford, wife of George Russell, 10th Duke of Bedford
- Alfred Mews and Alfred Place – after Alfred Waddilove, son of John, who built this street in 1806
- Argyle Square, Argyll Street and Argyle Walk – named for Argyll in Scotland
- Bainbridge Street – after Henry Bainbridge, local resident in the 17th century
- Barbon Close – after 17th-century property developer Nicholas Barbon
- Barter Street – after the Bloomsbury Market, which stood here in the 17th – 19th centuries
- Bayley Street – after Sir John Bayley, 1st Baronet, 18th–19th-century judge who lived nearby on Bedford Square
- Beaumont Place – after Joseph Beaumont, who built this street in 1791
- Bedford Avenue, Bedford Place, Bedford Square and Bedford Way – after the earls/dukes of Bedford
- Belgrove Street – formerly Belgrave Street, thought to be for a Warwickshire locality of this name
- Bernard Street – after Sir Thomas Bernard, 3rd Baronet, 18th–19th-century social reformer who held several high level positions at the nearby Foundling Hospital
- Bidborough Street – after Bidborough in Kent, home county of local 16th-century landowner Andrew Judd
- Birkenhead Street – after Birkenhead in Cheshire; formerly Liverpool Street
- Bloomsbury Court, Bloomsbury Place, Bloomsbury Square, Bloomsbury Street and Bloomsbury Way – the name is first noted in 1201, when William de Blemond, a Norman landowner, acquired the land The name Bloomsbury is a development from Blemondisberi – the bury, or manor, of Blemond.
- Boswell Court and Boswell Street – after local 17th bricklayer Edward Boswell
- Brownlow Mews – after William Brownlow, local 17th-century landowner (further to the south, hence Brownlow Street in Holborn); his daughter Elizabeth married into the Doughty family, who owned land in this area
- Brunswick Square – after the German city of Braunschweig (Brunswick), by connection with the reigning House of Hanover
- Burton Place and Burton Street – after the 18th-century architect James Burton, who worked on the nearby Foundling Hospital and Bedford estate
- Bury Place – a shortening of 'Bloomsbury'
- Byng Place – after George Byng, 4th Viscount Torrington, father-in-law to John Russell, 6th Duke of Bedford
- Capper Street – after the Capper farmer, tenant farmers on this land in the 17th – 18th centuries
- Cartwright Gardens – after John Cartwright, 19th-century political reformer who lived here; it was originally Burton Crescent, after the architect James Burton
- Chenies Mews and Chenies Street – after the village of Chenies, which belonged to the Russells from 1526 to 1954
- Cockpit Yard – site of a cock fighting yard in the 18th century
- Colonnade – this was formerly a Georgian-era colonnade of shops
- Compton Place
- Coptic Street – named in 1894 after a recent acquisition of Coptic manuscripts by the British Museum; before this it was Duke Street, after the dukes of Bedford
- Coram Street – after Thomas Coram, 18th-century founder of the Foundling Hospital which was formerly near here
- Cosmo Place – after Cosmo George Gordon, 3rd Duke of Gordon, grandfather of Lady Georgiana, wife of John Russell, 6th Duke of Bedford
- Crestfield Street – unknown, formerly Chesterfield Street
- Cromer Street – formerly Lucas Street, which had gained notoriety due to the landlord of a local inn (the Lucas Arms) being involved with the Gordon Riots; it was changed to the neutral Cromer, for the town in Norfolk
- Dombey Street – named is 1936 after local resident Charles Dickens's book Dombey and Son; it was formerly East Street, in relation to the nearby New North Street
- Doughty Mews and Doughty Street – after the Doughty family, local landowners in the 18th century
- Dukes Road – after the dukes of Bedford, local landowners
- Dyott Street – after either Simon Dyott, local resident in the 17th century or Jane Dyott, granddaughter or local landowner Henry Bainbridge
- Emerald Court and Emerald Street – Green Street prior to 1885, changed to avoid confusion with numerous other streets of that name
- Endsleigh Gardens, Endsleigh Place and Endsleigh Street – after Endsleigh, a property in Tavistock, Devon owned by the dukes of Bedford
- Euston Road – after the earl of Euston, son of the duke of Grafton, local landowners when the road was built in the 1760s
- Flaxman Terrace – after the John Flaxman, 18th–19th-century sculptor who is buried at the nearby St Pancras Old Church
- Gage Street – unknown
- Galen Place – after Ancient Greek physician Galen, by connection with the Pharmaceutical Society whose examination hall formerly stood here
- Gilbert Place
- Gordon Square and Gordon Street – after Cosmo George Gordon, 3rd Duke of Gordon, grandfather of Lady Georgiana, wife of John Russell, 6th Duke of Bedford
- Gower Court, Gower Mews, Gower Place and Gower Street – after Gertrude Leveson-Gower, wife of John Russell, 4th Duke of Bedford
- Grafton Way – after local landowners the dukes of Grafton
- Gray's Inn Road – from Lord Grey of Wilton, owner of a local inn or town house which was later leased to lawyers in the 16th century
- Great James Street – after James Burgess who worked with George Brownlow Doughty and his wife Frances Tichborne in the development of the area.
- Great Ormond Street, Ormond Close and Ormond Mews – thought to commemorate James Butler, 1st Duke of Ormonde, prominent 17th-century soldier
- Great Russell Street – see Russell Square
- Grenville Street – after William Wyndham Grenville, 1st Baron Grenville, prominent 19th-century politician
- Guilford Place and Guilford Street – after Prime Minister Lord North, 2nd Earl of Guildford, who was also President of the nearby Foundling Hospital from 1771 until his death
- Handel Street – after the 18th-century composer George Frederick Handel, a benefactor of the nearby Foundling Hospital and organist at its chapel
- Harpur Mews and Harpur Street – after either local 18th-century landowner Peter Harpur or Sir William Harpur, founder of the Bedford School
- Harrison Street – after local 18th–19th-century landowners and brickmakers the Harrison family
- Hastings Street – after Hastings in Sussex, near to Kent, home county of local 16th-century landowner Andrew Judd
- Heathcote Street – after Michael Heathcote, governor of the nearby Foundling Hospital in the early 19th century
- Henrietta Mews – named after Foundling Hospital vice-president (mid-19th century) Sir Stephen Gaselee's wife Henrietta
- Herbrand Street – after Herbrand Arthur Russell, 11th Duke of Bedford
- High Holborn – thought to be from 'hollow bourne' i.e. the river Fleet which formerly flowed in a valley near here. The 'High' stems from the fact that the road led away from the river to higher ground.
- Hunter Street – after prominent 18th-century surgeon John Hunter, by association with adjacent School of Medicine
- Huntley Street – after Cosmo George Gordon, 3rd Duke of Gordon, Marquess of Huntly, grandfather of Lady Georgiana, wife of John Russell, 6th Duke of Bedford
- John's Mews and John Street – after local 18th-century carpenter John Blagrave
- Judd Street – after Andrew Judd, who developed the local area via the Skinners' Company in the 1570s
- Kenton Street – after the 18th-century vintner Benjamin Kenton, benefactor of the nearby Foundling Hospital
- Keppel Street – after Elizabeth Keppel, wife of Francis Russell, Marquess of Tavistock
- King's Mews – by association with Theobald's Road, formerly King's Way
- Kirk Street
- Lamb's Conduit Street – named after William Lambe, in recognition of the £1,500 he gave for the rebuilding of the Holborn Conduit in 1564. (According to The London Encyclopaedia, "The conduit was an Elizabethan dam made in one of the tributaries of the Fleet River and restored in 1577 by William Lamb, who also provided 120 pails for poor women")
- Lamp Office Court –
- Lansdowne Terrace – after William Petty, 1st Marquess of Lansdowne, Prime Minister 1782–83
- Leigh Street – after Leigh in Kent, home county of local 16th-century landowner Andrew Judd
- Long Yard – simply a descriptive name for this former stable yard
- Loxham Street – possibly for directors of the East End Dwellings Company who developed these streets in the 1890s
- Lytton Court
- Mabledon Place – after Mabledon House near Tonbridge in Kent, built by James Burton in 1804 and extended by his son Decimus Burton. Kent was the home county of local 16th-century landowner Andrew Judd
- Malet Place and Malet Street – after Sir Edward Baldwin Malet, 4th Baronet, husband of Lady Ermyntrude Sackville Russell, daughter of Francis Russell, 9th Duke of Bedford
- Marchmont Street – after Hugh Hume-Campbell, 3rd Earl of Marchmont, governor of the nearby Foundling Hospital
- Mecklenburgh Place, Mecklenburgh Square and Mecklenburgh Street – after Queen Charlotte of Mecklenburg-Strelitz, wife George III, reigning monarch when the square was built
- Midhope Street – possibly for directors of the East End Dwellings Company who developed these streets in the 1890s
- Millman Mews, Millman Place and Millman Street – after local 17th-century landowner William Millman
- Montague Place and Montague Street – after Montagu House, built in the 1670 for Ralph Montagu, 1st Duke of Montagu, which was formerly on the site of the British Museum
- Mortimer Market – after the market formerly on this site, founded by Hans Winthrop Mortimer in 1768
- Morwell Street – after Morwell in Devon, where local landowners the dukes of Bedford held land
- Museum Street – after the British Museum adjacent
- New North Street – as it leads northwards from Red Lions Square, 'New' so as to contract with Old North Street which continues southwards
- North Crescent and South Crescent – simply description of their shape
- Northington Street – after Robert Henley, 1st Earl of Northington, Lord Chancellor 1761–66
- North Mews – after Lord North, Prime Minister
- Old Gloucester Street – after Prince William, Duke of Gloucester, son of Queen Anne; the street was formerly just 'Gloucester Street' until 1873
- Orde Hall Street – after Orde Hall, 19th-century chairman representing this area at the Metropolitan Board of Works
- Pied Bull Court and Pied Bull Yard –
- Powis Place – former site of Powis House, built for William Herbert, 2nd Marquess of Powis, a prominent 17th–18th-century Jacobite
- Queen Anne's Walk and Queen Square and Queen Square Place – after Queen Anne, reigning monarch when the square was laid out
- Queen's Yard
- Regent Square – after the Prince Regent, later George IV; the square dates to after the Regency ended, however the name has already been chosen years before
- Richbell Place – after its 18th-century builder, John Richbell
- Ridgmount Gardens, Ridgmount Place and Ridgmount Street – after Ridgmont, Bedfordshire, where the dukes of Bedford also owned land
- Roger Street – renamed in 1937 from 'Henry Street', after local landowner Henry Doughty
- Rossetti Court
- Rugby Street – after Rugby School; its founder Lawrence Sheriff gave land here in 1567 as an endowment
- Russell Square and Great Russell Street – after the Russell family
- St Chad's Street – after the nearby St Chad's well, reputed to be a medieval holy well; St Chad was a 7th-century bishop
- St Giles Circus, St Giles High Street and St Giles Passage – after St Giles Hospital, a leper hospital founded by Matilda of Scotland, wife of Henry I in 1117. It later became St Giles in the Fields. St Giles was an 8th-century hermit in Provence who was crippled in a hunting accident and later became patron saint of cripples and lepers. Circus is a British term for a road junction.
- St Peter's Court
- Sandwich Street – after Sandwich in Kent, home county of local 16th-century landowner Andrew Judd
- Seaford Street – thought to be named for Seaford in Sussex
- Shropshire Place
- Sicilian Avenue – this Italianate arch is built from Sicilian marble
- Sidmouth Mews and Sidmouth Street – either for Sidmouth in Devon, then a fashionable resort town or Prime Minister Henry Addington, 1st Viscount Sidmouth
- Southampton Place and Southampton Row – Southampton House, home of the earls of Southampton, formerly stood here in the 16th century
- South Crescent Mews
- Speedy Place – after the Speedy family, landlords of the former nearby pub the Golden Boot
- Stedham Place
- Store Street – unknown
- Streatham Street – after Streatham, where local landowners the dukes of Bedford also owned property
- Tankerton Street – possibly for directors of the East End Dwellings Company who developed these streets in the 1890s
- Tavistock Place and Tavistock Square – after Tavistock, Devon, where the dukes of Bedford owned property
- Taviton Street – after Taviton, Devon, where the dukes of Bedford owned property
- Thanet Street – after Thanet in Kent, home county of local 16th-century landowner Andrew Judd
- Theobald's Road – this road formerly formed part of a route used by Stuart monarchs to their hunting grounds at Theobalds House, Hertfordshire
- Thornhaugh Mews and Thornhaugh Street – after the dukes of Bedford, also titled Barons Russell of Thornhaugh
- Tonbridge Street and Tonbridge Walk – after Tonbridge in Kent, home town of Andrew Judd, local landowner of the 16th century
- Torrington Place and Torrington Square – after George Byng, 4th Viscount Torrington, father-in-law to John Russell, 6th Duke of Bedford
- Tottenham Court Road, Tottenham Mews and Tottenham Street – after the former manor of Tottenham (Tottenhall) which stood here from the 13th century, possibly from one local William de Tottenall, or else meaning 'Tota's Hall'. The name later became confused with the unconnected Tottenham, Middlesex
- United Alley
- University Street – due to its location near London University
- Vernon Place – after Elizabeth Wriothesley, Countess of Southampton, (née Vernon), ancestor to Rachel Russell, Lady Russell, wife of William Russell, Lord Russell of the local landowning Russell family
- Wakefield Mews and Wakefield Street – after a former local pub, the Pindar of Wakefield
- Westking Place
- Whidborne Street – possibly for directors of the East End Dwellings Company who developed these streets in the 1890s
- Willoughby Street – after George P. Willoughby, mayor of Holborn Borough in the 1910s
- Woburn Place, Woburn Square, Woburn Walk and Upper Woburn Place – after Woburn Abbey, principal seat of local landowners the dukes of Bedford
- Woolf Mews – presumably after the author and local resident Virginia Woolf

== Bibliography ==
- "Streets Index". UCL Bloomsbury Project. UCL. 14 April 2011.
