= Iron railing =

Fence made of iron

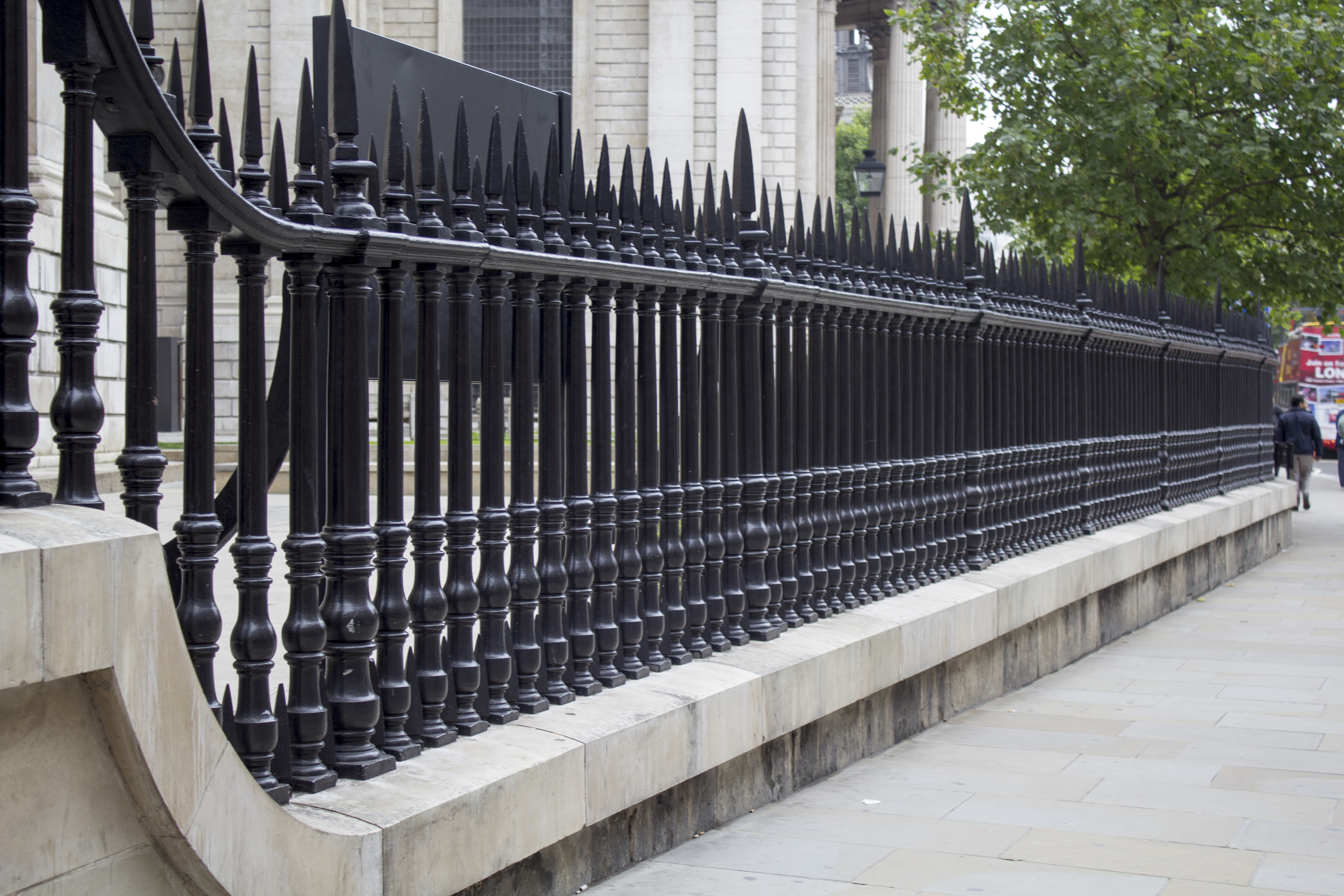
The wrought iron railings at St Paul's Cathedral, London.

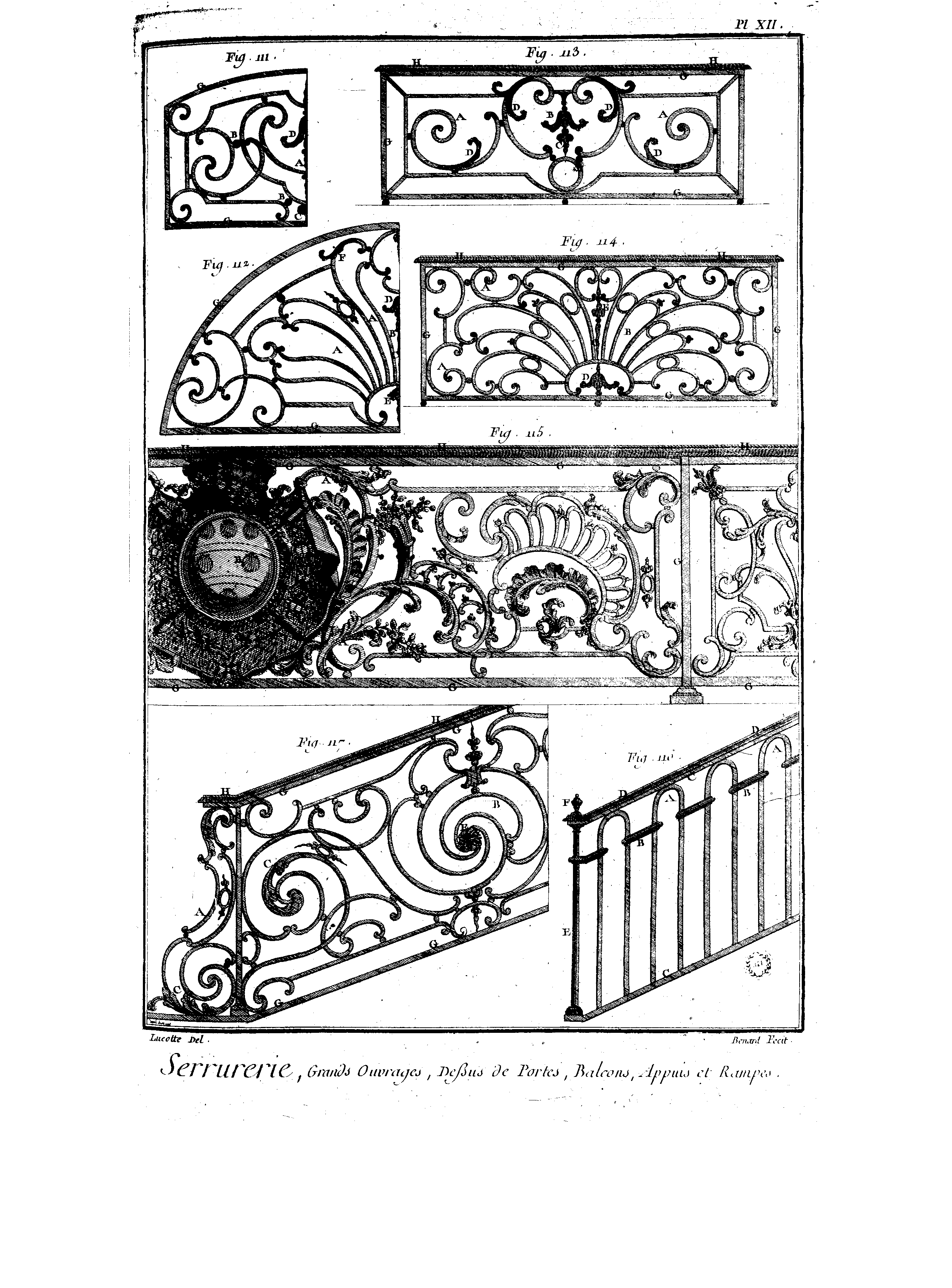
Designs for decorative railings from 1771.

Passers-by look for the phantom railings in Malet Street.

An iron railing is a fence made of iron. This may either be wrought iron, which is ductile and durable and may be hammered into elaborate shapes when hot, or the cheaper cast iron, which is of low ductility and quite brittle. Cast iron can also produce complicated shapes, but these are created through the use of moulds of compressed sand rather than hammering, which would be likely to damage the iron.

== History ==
One of the earliest uses of cast iron railings in England was in 1710–14 at St Paul's Cathedral, despite the objections of Christopher Wren, who did not want a fence around the Cathedral at all, and said that if there had to be one it should be of wrought rather than cast iron. The set was made at Gloucester Furnace, Lamberhurst, in the Weald of Kent and surrounded the cathedral, including seven gates. It weighed two hundred tons and cost six pence a pound. The total cost was £11,202 which was a fortune then. No further railings are known to have been cast in the Weald. Other early uses of cast iron railings were at Cambridge Senate House and at St Martin-in-the-Fields, London.

Wrought iron may be used to construct ornate railings. The Davies brothers of Wrexham made such railings in the 18th century and these are much admired — Nikolaus Pevsner described their work as "miraculous". They made fine wrought iron railings for Stansty Park and these may now be seen at Erddig Hall.

During the summer of 1941, during World War II, the United States stopped exporting scrap metal to the UK. The government declared, in response, that all unnecessary metal, including railings and gates, was to be removed, melted down and utilised for the war effort. Many sets of iron railings in Britain were removed. Railings were usually cut off at the base; the stubs may still be seen outside many buildings in London and elsewhere where they have never been replaced. This was supposedly to provide scrap metal for munitions, but there is some scepticism as to whether they were actually used for this purpose.

In 2012 artist Catalina Pollak created an interactive sound installation called Phantom Railings in Malet Street Gardens, London, the site of railings that were removed during World War II. Acoustic sensors pick up the movement of pedestrians walking by and translate it into "the familiar sound produced by running a stick along an iron fence".

== Cheshire ==
In the county of Cheshire, hedging at road junctions and corners which could restrict visibility of approaching vehicles was replaced by black-and-white railings with a distinctive curved top. They are now characteristic of the area and are being restored where they have become dilapidated.

== United States ==
Stewart Iron Works in Covington, Kentucky was once the largest wrought iron fence manufacturer in the world. The factory supplied the decorative fences for the Panama Canal, the British Embassy in Washington, D.C., the Taft Museum, as well as the entrance gates to the White House, the Rutherford B. Hayes Presidential Center, and the U.S. House of Representatives and others.

== Gallery ==
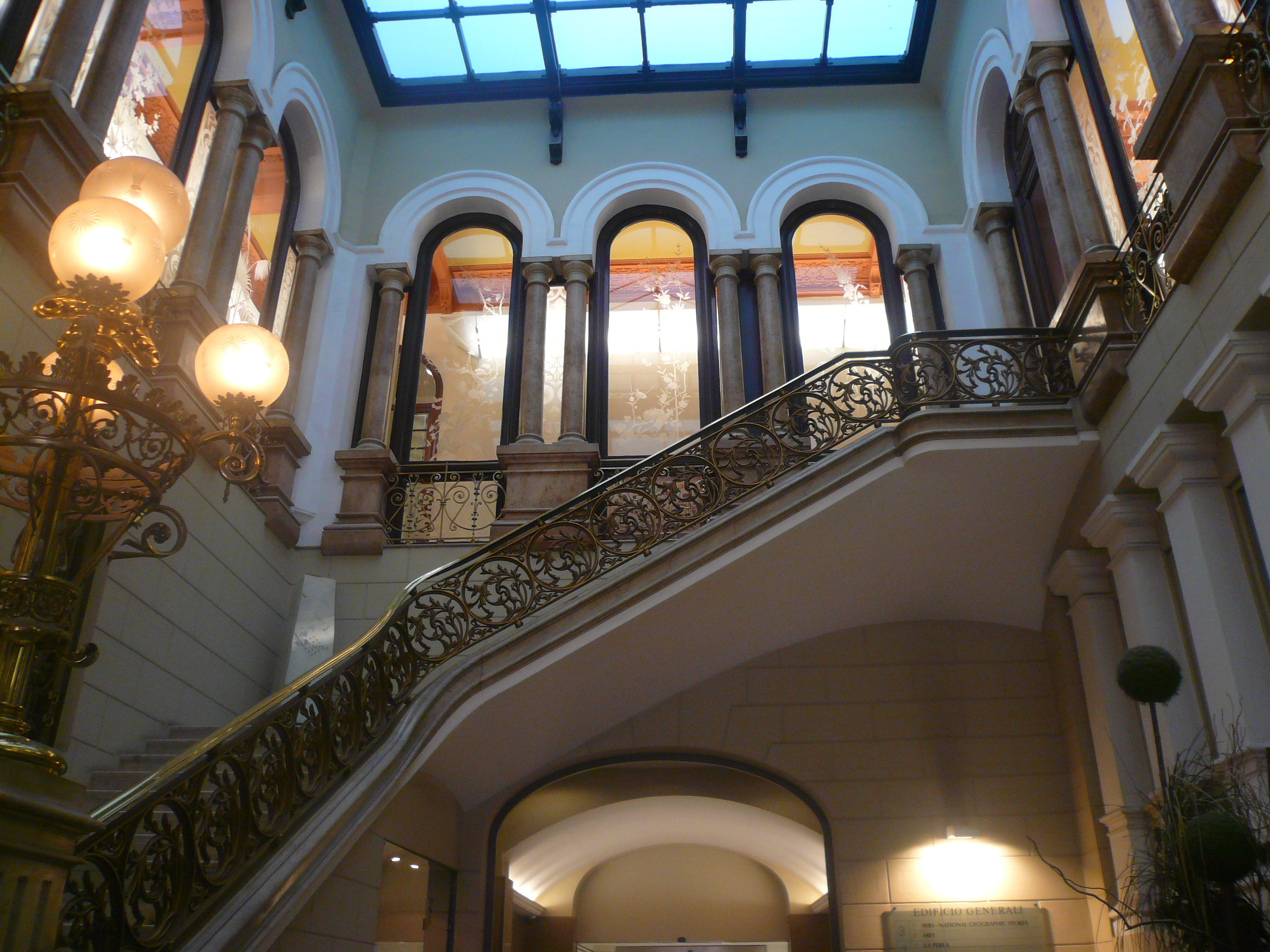
Casa Juncadella, Barcelona

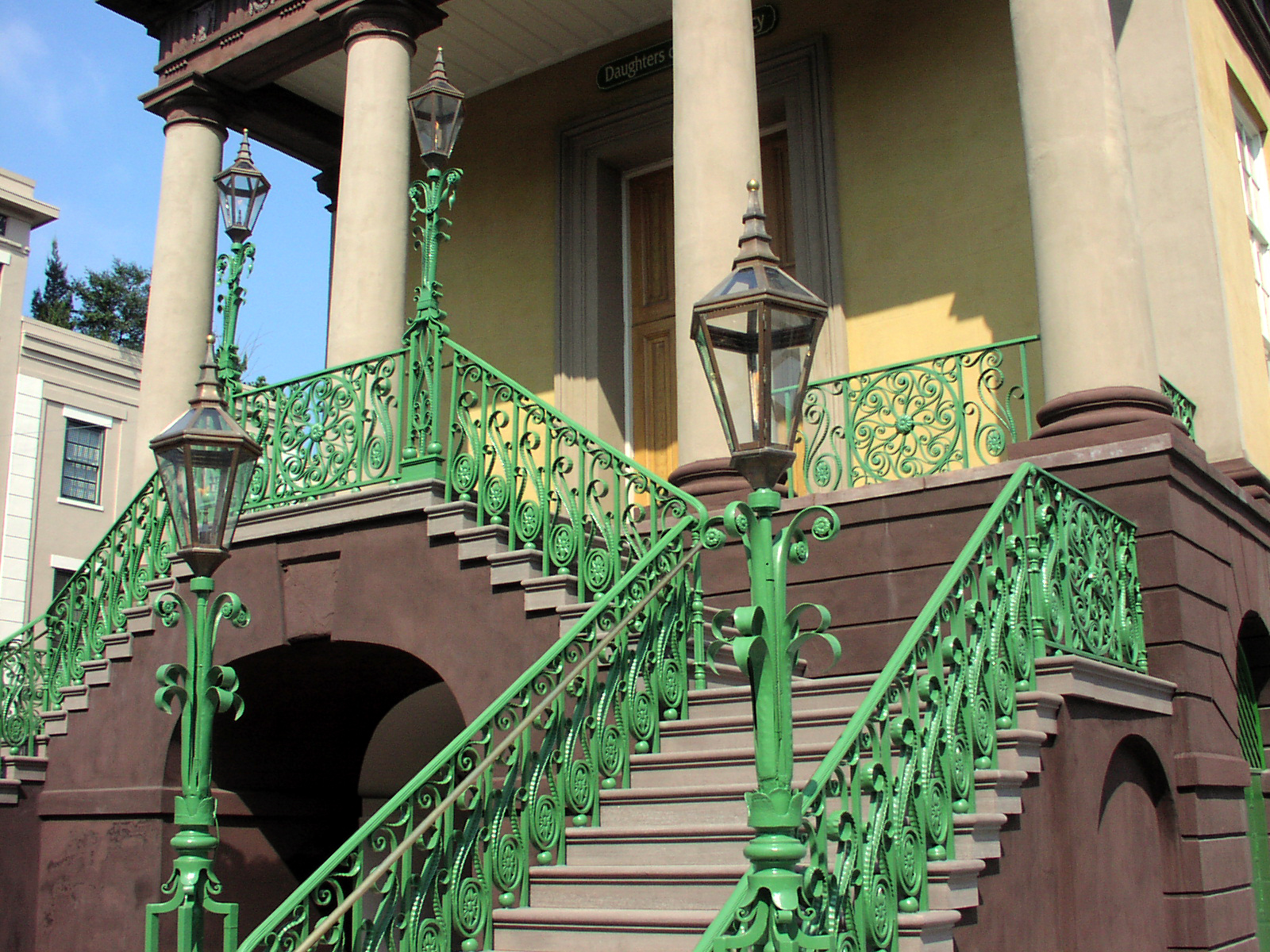
Charleston, South Carolina

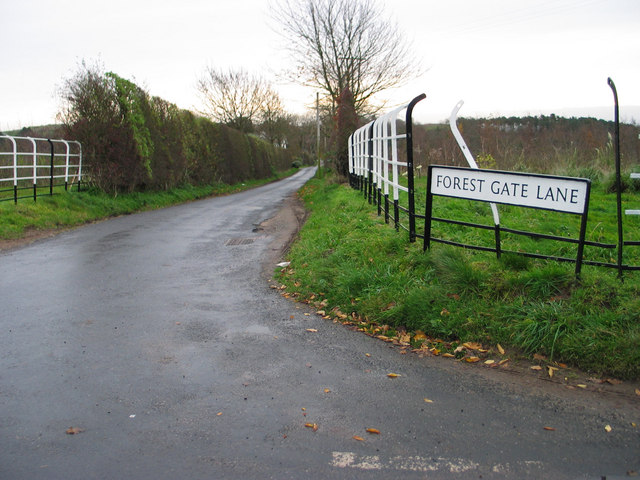
Cheshire railings

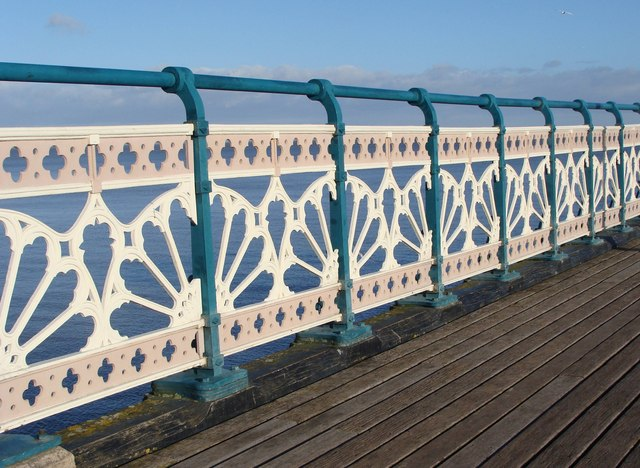
Penarth Pier

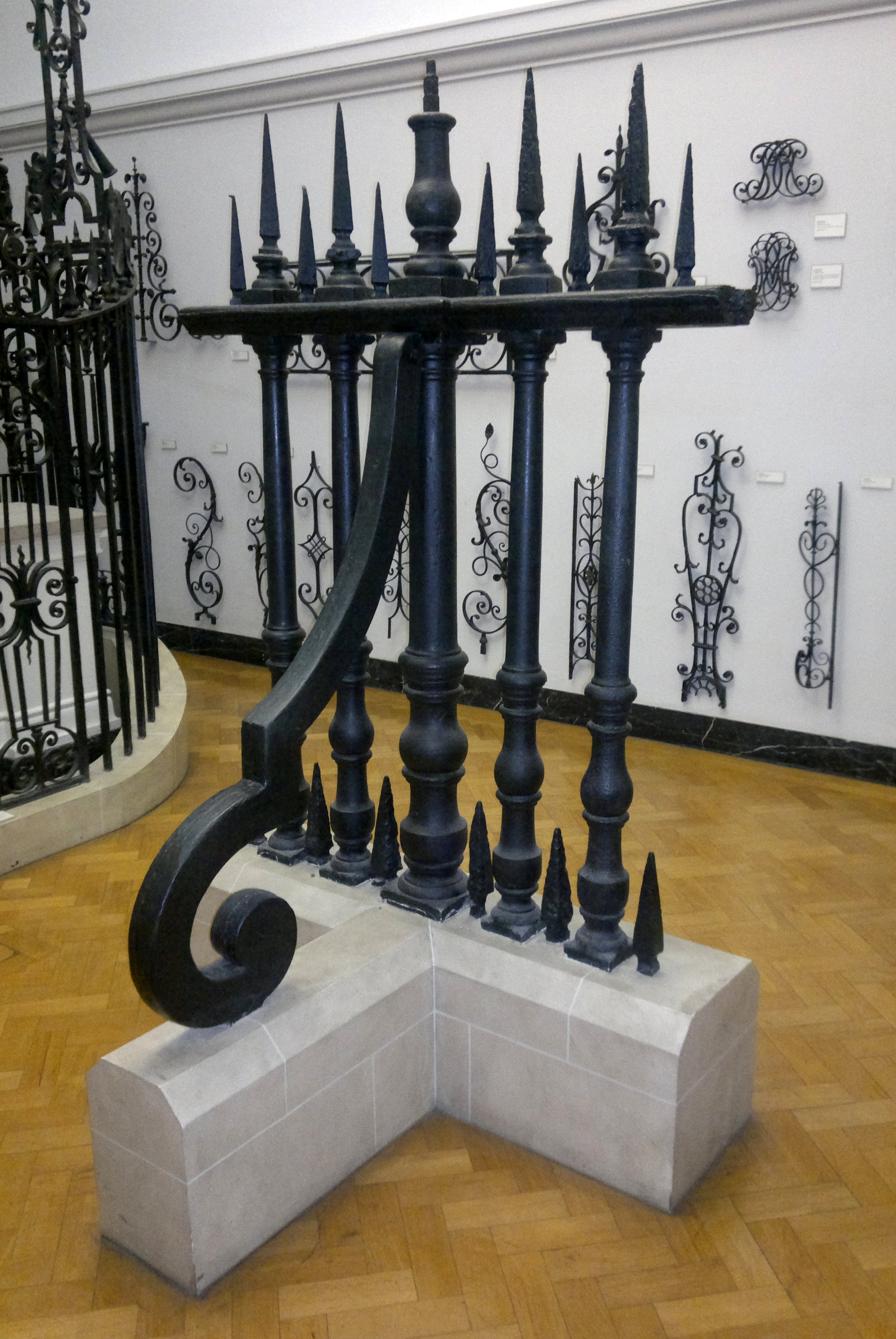
Railings from St. Paul's Cathedral in the Victoria & Albert Museum

== See also ==
- Ironwork
