= Ridgmount Gardens =

Street in Bloomsbury, London, England

Coordinates: 51°31′18.07″N 0°7′57.41″W

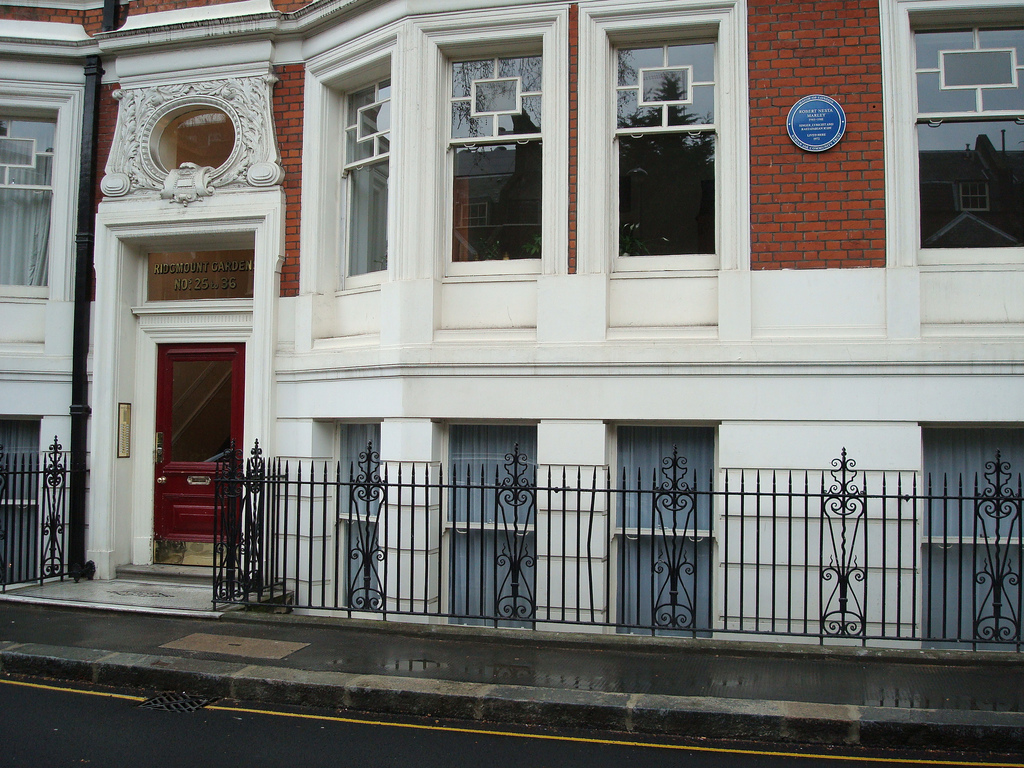
The blue plaque commemorating the flat at 34 Ridgmount Gardens, where reggae icon Bob Marley lived in 1972

Ridgmount Gardens is a street in Bloomsbury, London, that runs from Torrington Place in the north to Chenies Street in the south. It runs parallel with Huntley Street and Gower Street and is continued by Ridgmount Place in the south.

On the western side of the street is the Ridgmount Gardens mansion block, on the eastern side is a long narrow garden which backs on to the gardens of the houses of Gower Street.

The Ridgmount Gardens mansion block was built in the 1890s and includes 149 flats. The freehold of the properties is owned and managed by the Bedford Estate .

== Inhabitants ==
The poet and playwright George Egerton (Mrs Golding Bright) (1859–1945) lived at number 59.

Novelist and dramatist Joseph Hatton (1837–1907) lived at number 87.

Reggae musician Bob Marley (1945–1981) lived at 34 Ridgmount Gardens in 1972 and a blue plaque marks the spot.

On Christmas Eve 1961, Hylda Baker (4 February 1905 – 1 May 1986) was hit by a passing car that mounted the pavement in London's Charing Cross Road, not far from her then home at 97 Ridgmount Gardens.
