= Chenies Street =

Street in Bloomsbury, London

Coordinates: 51°31′14″N 0°7′59″W

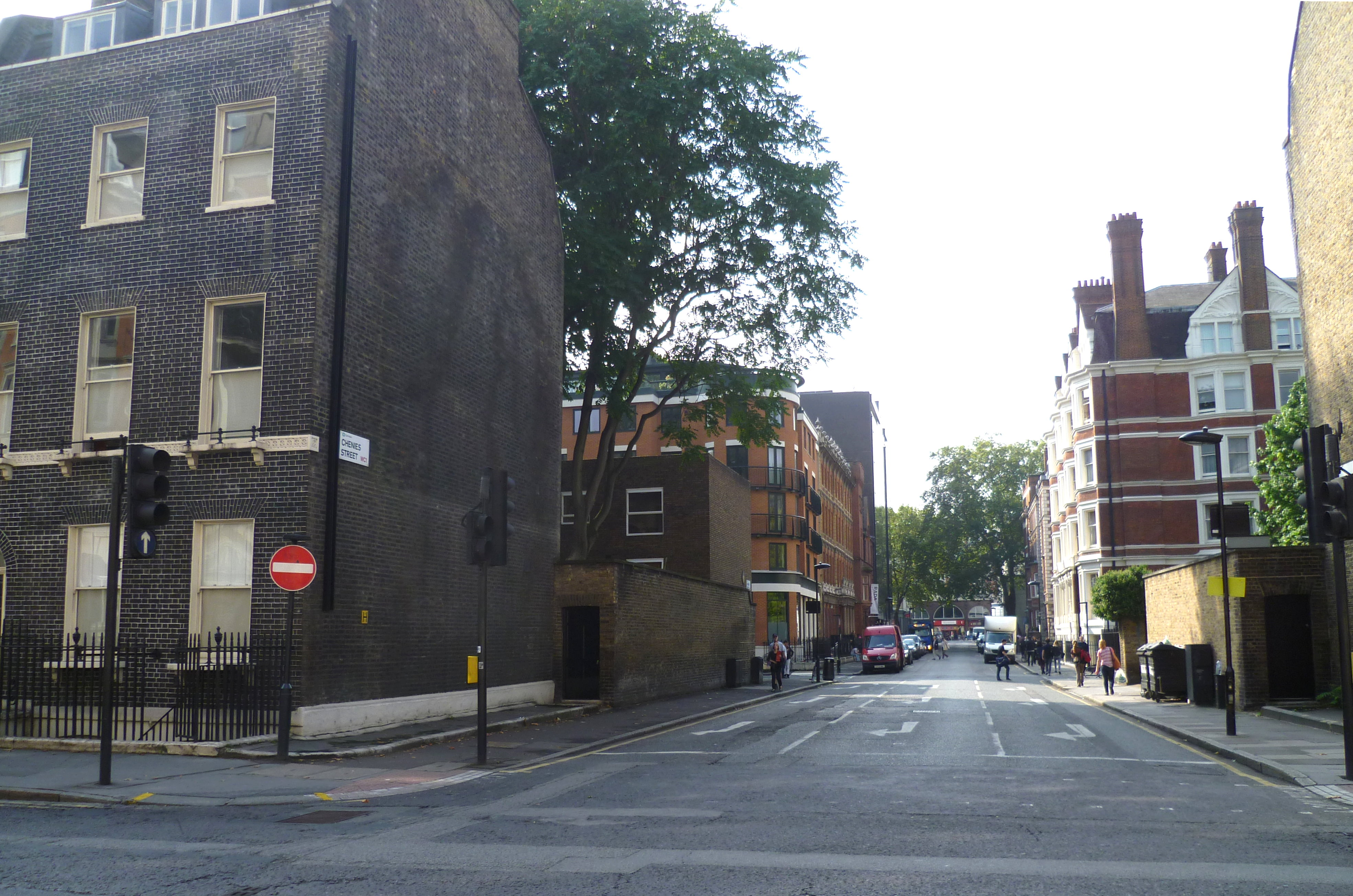
Chenies Street from the junction with Gower Street looking west

Chenies Street is a street in Bloomsbury, London, that runs between Tottenham Court Road and Gower Street. It is the location of a number of notable buildings such as Minerva House, the Drill Hall (now RADA Studios), and a memorial to The Rangers, 12th County of London Regiment. North Crescent starts and ends on the northern side of Chenies Street.

== Location ==
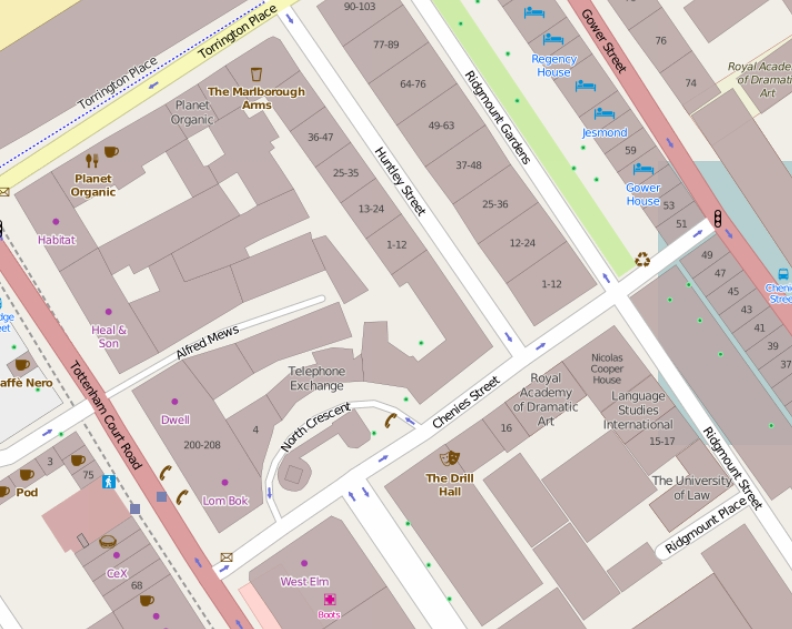
The immediate vicinity of Chenies Street, London

Chenies Street runs between Tottenham Court Road in the west and Gower Street in the east. Alfred Place joins the street on its south side, Huntley Street on the north, and Ridgmount Gardens/Ridgmount Street crosses the street at its eastern end. North Crescent is on the northern side of the street.

== History ==
Chenies Street was built around 1776 on land belonging to the Bedford Estate. It was named after Chenies Manor in Buckinghamshire, originally owned by Anne Sapcote, who was the wife of John Russell, 1st Earl of Bedford. Before Chenies Street was built, Cox's Gardens was located at the eastern end of the plot. Chenies Street has been extensively changed since it was first laid out, being rebuilt in the mid-nineteenth century and again in the twentieth century on the north side.

== Notable inhabitants ==
The writer Fanny Burney (1752–1840) lived at 23 Chenies Street in 1812–13.

Watchmaker Thomas Earnshaw (1749–1829) died at his home in the street.

Algernon Charles Swinburne (1837–1909), whose literary works scandalised Victorian Britain, lived at 12 North Crescent.

== Notable buildings ==
East to west:

=== Minerva House ===
Minerva House in North Crescent is a former car showroom and workshop that is a Grade II listed building with English Heritage. It is now a media agency. The building was designed by George Vernon in Portland stone ashlar for the Minerva Motor Company, 1912–13. The Minerva company originated in Belgium as a manufacturer of bicycles, before branching out into early forms of motorbikes and then motor cars. Charles Rolls was a Minerva dealer in England. The design of the building includes three large bays on the ground floor flanked by two entrance ways each marked Minerva House. Above are three storeys of offices with a statue of Minerva on the top floor. The building and the rest of the crescent once looked out on to gardens until the deep-level shelter was built during the Second World War.

=== Deep-level shelter ===
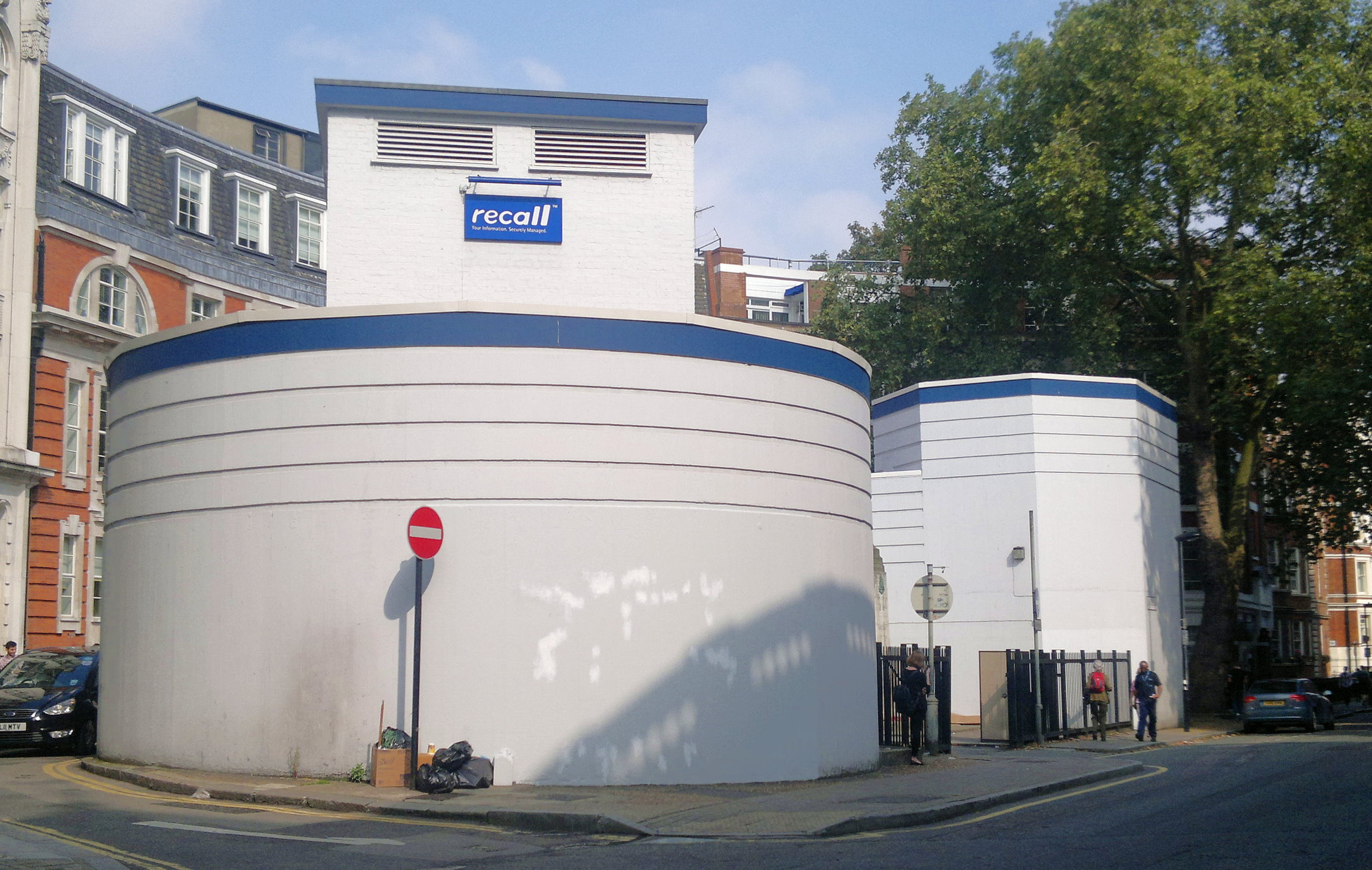
Chenies Street entrance to the Goodge Street tube station deep-level shelter

During the Second World War, a number of deep-level shelters were built beneath London tube stations for the protection of the public and military from German bombing. The shelter underneath Goodge Street Underground station was completed in 1942 and has two above ground entrances, one on the north side of Chenies Street on the island between Chenies Street and North Crescent, and another nearby on the western side of Tottenham Court Road, next to the American International Church. There is also access from within Goodge Street tube station. The Goodge Street shelter was used by the US Army Signal Corps during the preparations for D-Day.

After the war the shelter was used as an assembly centre for troops travelling to or from overseas bases. In 1956 a fire broke out in the shelter that required the attendance of twelve fire engines. Firemen tackled the blaze from each of the three entrances in teams of 30 using breathing apparatus. Seven were sent to hospital but no deaths were reported. Today the structure is used for archival storage.

=== Rangers memorial ===
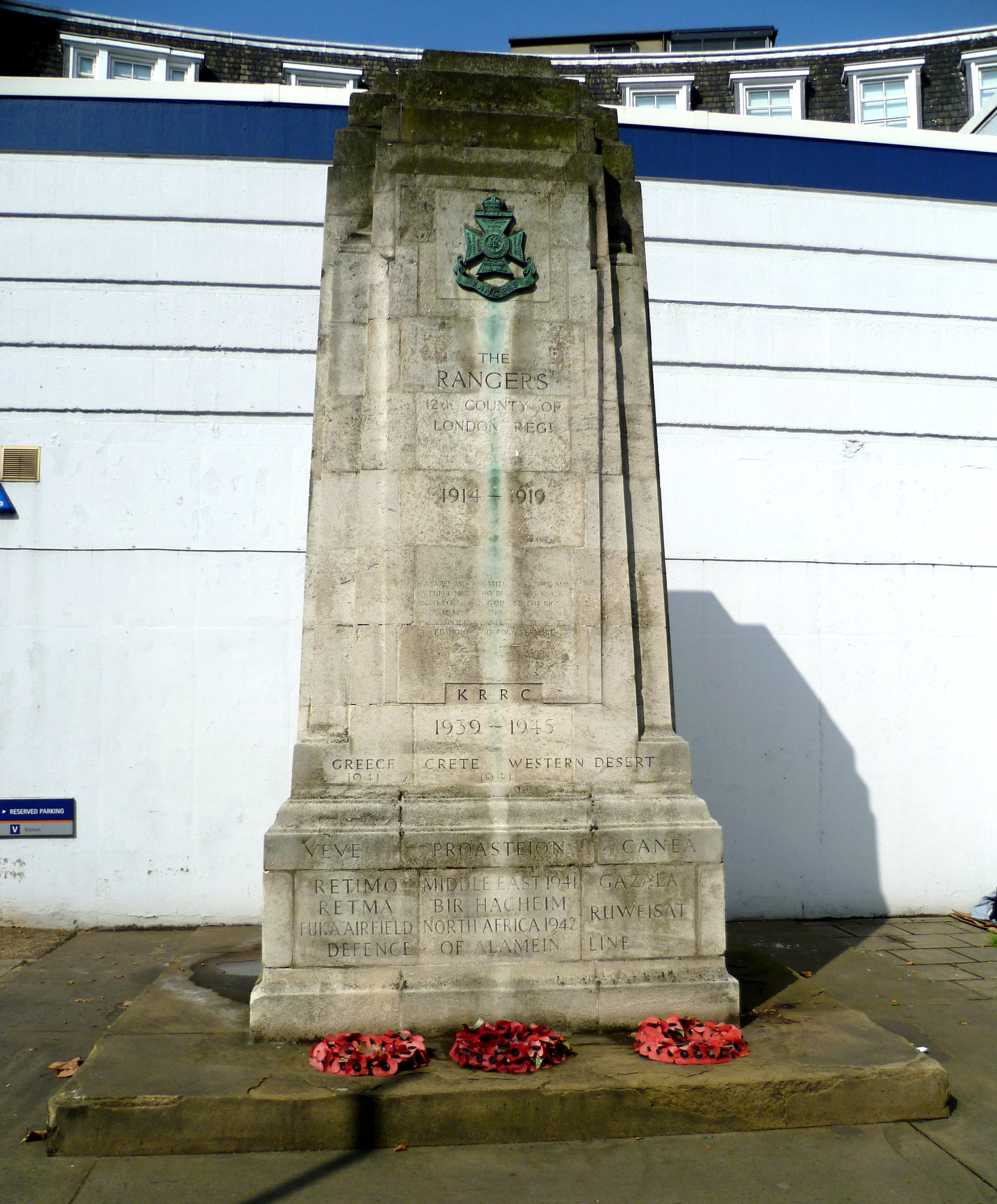
The Rangers memorial, North Crescent, Chenies Street

Within the deep-level shelter compound is a memorial to The Rangers, 12th County of London Regiment, which dates from shortly after the First World War and includes additional inscriptions relating to the service of the King's Royal Rifle Corps (KRRC) in the Second World War. The memorial is Grade II-listed and includes a bronze plaque with the regimental symbol. Wreaths are still laid at the site. The Rangers took over The Drill Hall at 16 Chenies Street previously occupied by the Bloomsbury Rifles when all British volunteer units were incorporated into the Territorial Army in 1907.

=== The Drill Hall ===
The Drill Hall on the south side at number 16, now known as RADA Studios, is a Grade II-listed building. It was designed for the Bloomsbury Rifles in 1882–83 by Samuel Knight, a captain in the unit. It is built of red brick with sandstone dressings and features a panel showing a hanging horn, the symbol of The Rifle Brigade, with which the Bloomsbury Rifles were affiliated. Above are the coats of arms of the Duke of Bedford, royal arms and the arms of the now dissolved county of Middlesex. The hall was paid for by the commanding officer of the Bloomsbury Rifles, Lieut-Col. Richards. In the 1900s Diaghilev and the Ballets Russes rehearsed at the hall, and during the Second World War it was the venue for Ralph Reader's Gang Shows.

Adjacent to The Drill Hall is number 18, which is also owned by RADA and contains rehearsal rooms, offices, the refectory and the RADA library. The building was purchased by RADA in 1990 with the help of the royalties left to the academy by George Bernard Shaw.

=== Chenies Street Chambers ===
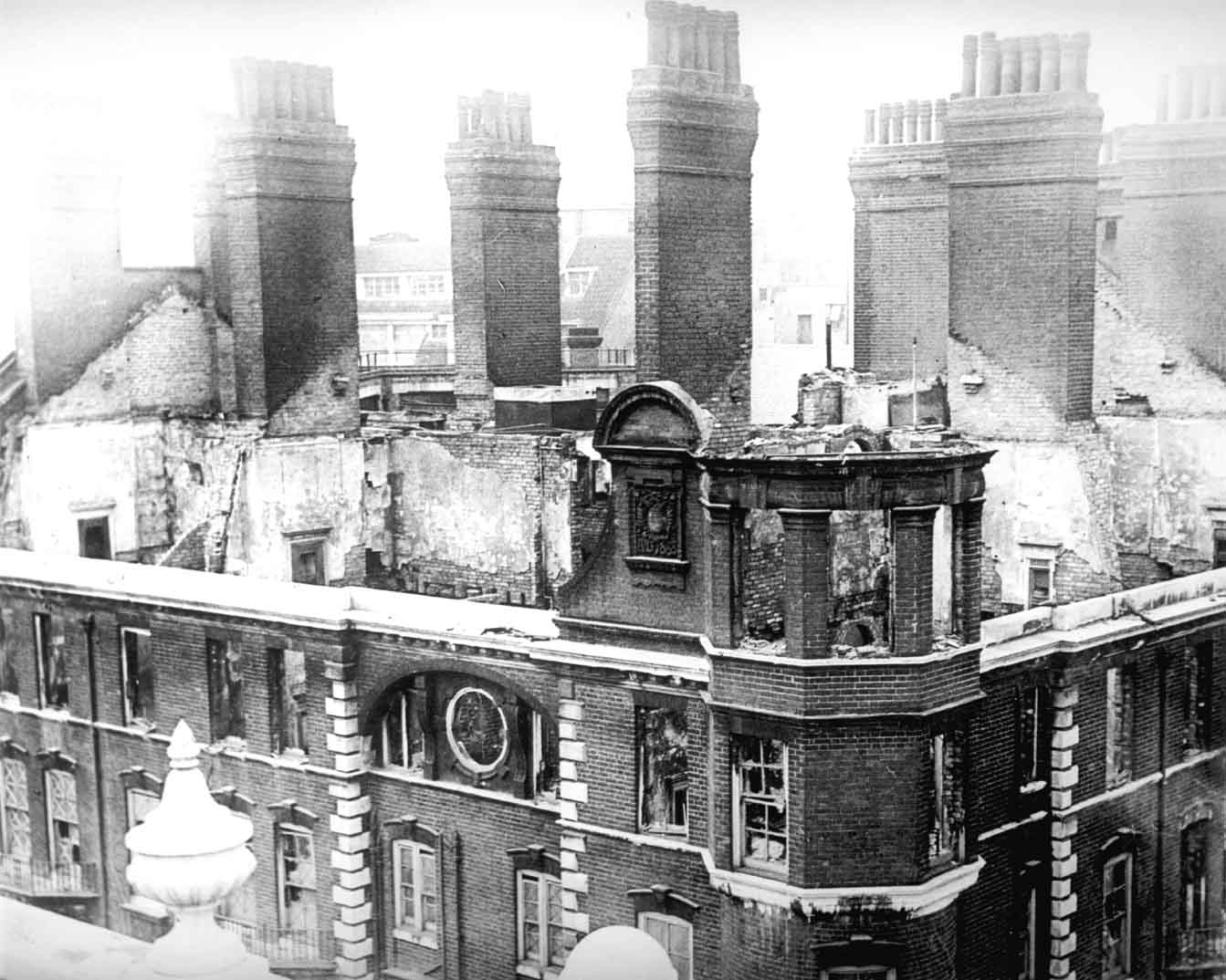
Chenies Street Chambers after bomb damage during the London Blitz, 1941

Chenies Street Chambers are at numbers 9–11 on the north side, immediately opposite The Drill Hall and on the corner with Huntley Street. The building was originally known as Chenies Street Chambers Ladies Residential Dwellings and was designed as flats for single professional women on behalf of the Ladies Dwellings Company founded by Agnes Garrett. The building was constructed about 1888 to the plans of architect J. M. Brydon and opened by suffragist Millicent Fawcett in 1889. Residents included the artist Florence Reason, Emily Penrose of Bedford College, campaigner Emily Hobhouse, archaeologist Mary Brodrick, historian Charlotte Fell-Smith, and the authors Adeline Sergeant and Olive Schreiner.

On 17 April 1941 the building was severely damaged when a German incendiary bomb hit it and started a fire. There were no casualties but the building was marked as so damaged as to make rebuilding doubtful. It was rebuilt, but with the entrance moved from Chenies Street to Huntley Street. The building then became social housing.

=== The Polyclinic ===
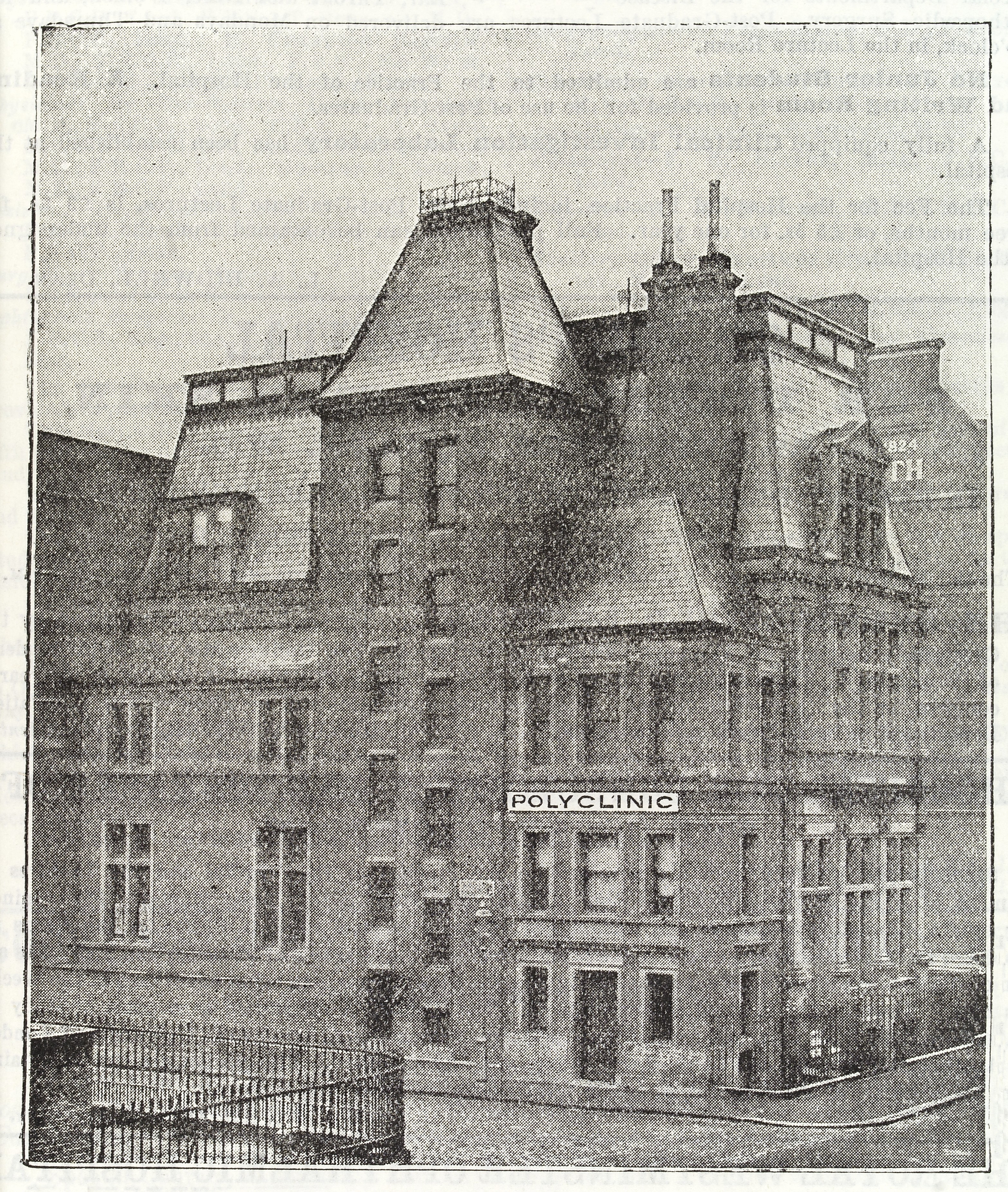
The Polyclinic (now demolished)

At number 22, on the corner with Ridgmount Street, once stood the Medical Graduates' College and Polyclinic, founded around 1899. It has since been replaced by Nicholas Cooper House, owned by RADA. The Polyclinic was the first British postgraduate medical institution.

=== Jewish High School for Girls ===
The Jewish High School for Girls and Day Training College for Teachers moved to Chenies Street in 1881 following the construction of a new building at a cost of over £8,000, funded by a gift from Isabel Goldsmid, sister of Sir Julian Goldsmid. The school closed in 1897.
