= Torrington Square =

Coordinates: 51.52201°N 0.13050°W

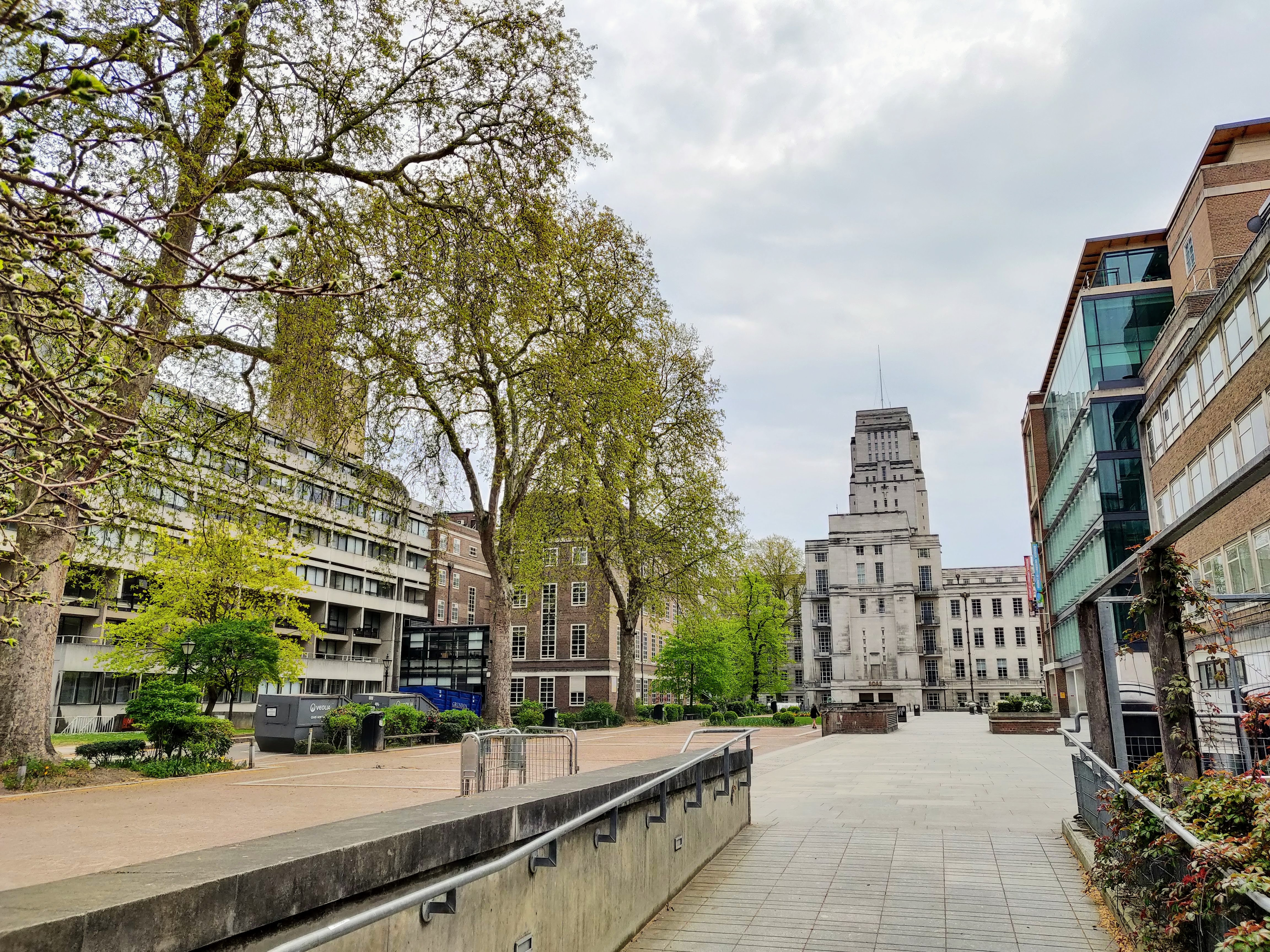
View of Torrington Square.

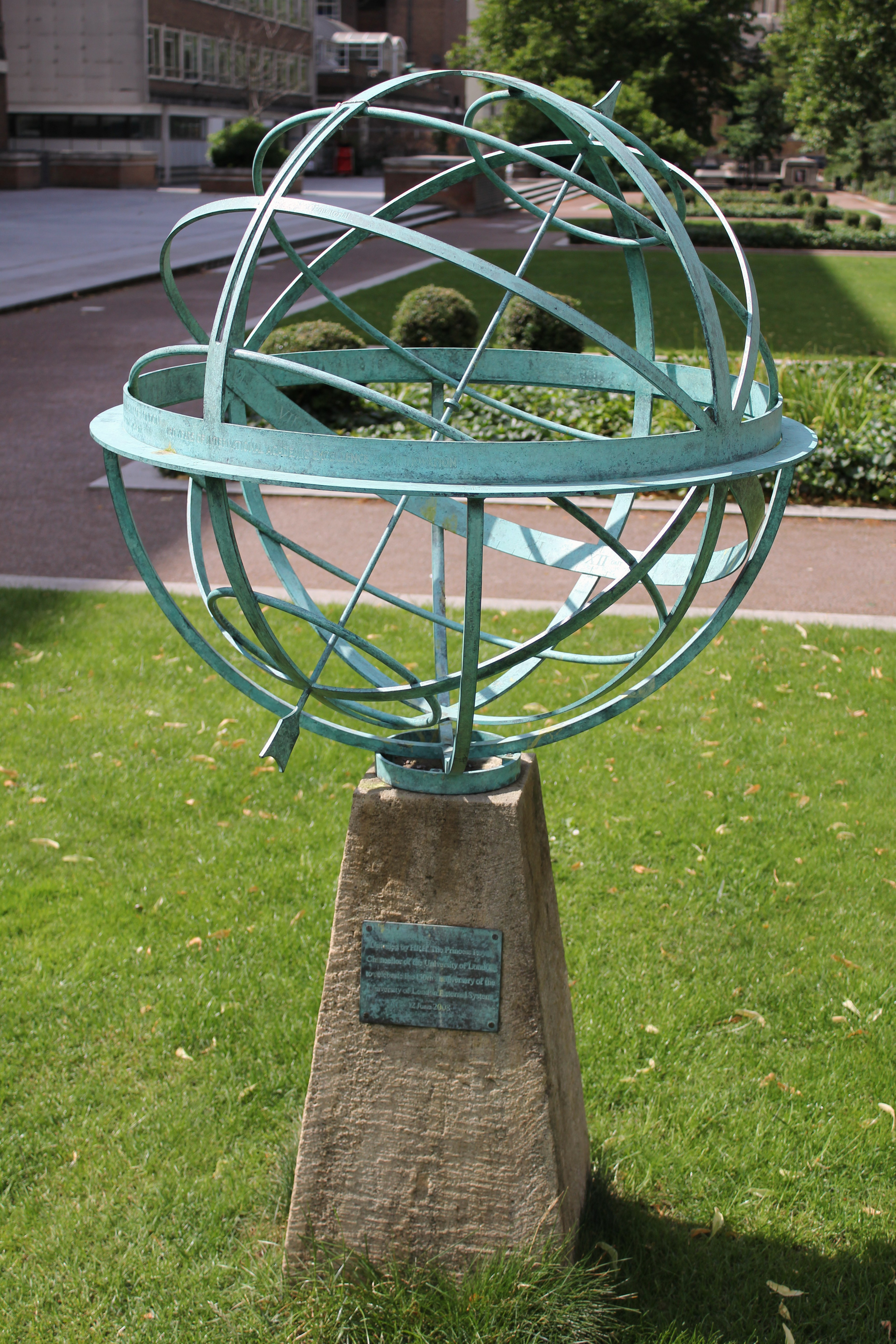
Armillary sphere sundial outside Birkbeck College in Torrington Square, unveiled on 12 June 2008 by Princess Anne to commemorate the 150th anniversary of the University of London External System.

Torrington Square is a square in Bloomsbury, owned by the University of London, located in central London, England. Today, the square is largely non-residential since most of the houses have been demolished by the university. The southern end of the square is dominated by the University of London's Senate House. Birkbeck College and the School of Oriental and African Studies (SOAS) are also located here. To the southwest is Malet Street and to the southeast is Russell Square. The square is the site of a weekly farmers' market, held on Thursdays.

== Notable people ==
John Desmond Bernal lived in a flat at the top of no. 22. In November 1950, Pablo Picasso, a fellow communist, en route to a Soviet-sponsored World Peace Congress in Sheffield created a mural in Bernal's flat. In 2007, this became part of the Wellcome Trust's collection for £250,000. It was displayed at the 2012 Tate Britain exhibition on Picasso and Modern British Art. The poet Christina Rossetti lived at 30 Torrington Square until her death here on 29 December 1894 from breast cancer.

== See also ==
Other squares on the Bedford Estate in Bloomsbury included:

- Bedford Square
- Bloomsbury Square
- Gordon Square
- Russell Square
- Tavistock Square
- Woburn Square

== Bibliography ==
- Rasmussen, Sten Eiler. London: The Unique City. London: Penguin (Pelican), 1960.
