= Woburn Square =

Garden square in Bloomsbury, London

Coordinates: 51°31′23″N 0°7′45″W

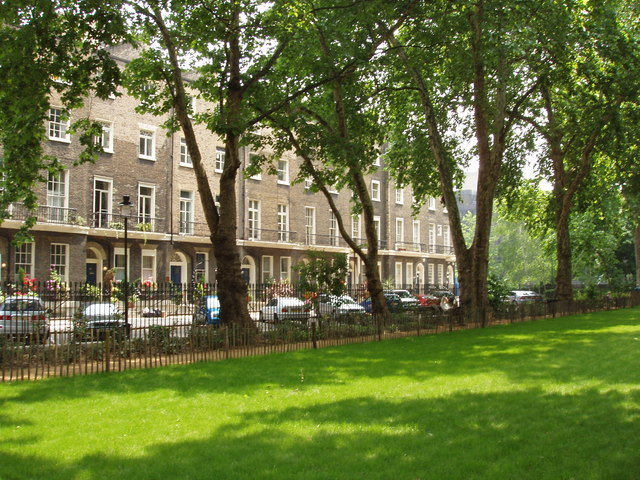
Woburn Square

Woburn Square is the smallest of the Bloomsbury squares and owned by the University of London. Designed by Thomas Cubitt and built between 1829 and 1847, it is named after Woburn Abbey, the main country seat of the Dukes of Bedford, who developed much of Bloomsbury.

The original construction was of 41 houses, smaller than those of adjoining Gordon Square and hence with lower rents. The square was built on the boundary between the parishes of St. Pancras and Holborn and the boundary marker stones are still visible in the gardens. The two squares were built to improve land that was originally marshland.

This narrow square was longer, extending down towards Russell Square, before the southern half and Christ Church (Lewis Vulliamy, 1833) were demolished in the 1970s to make space for new buildings for the School of Oriental and African Studies and the Institute of Education.

== See also ==
Other squares on the Bedford Estate in Bloomsbury included:

- Bedford Square
- Bloomsbury Square
- Gordon Square
- Russell Square
- Tavistock Square
- Torrington Square

additionally places of interest

- Woburn Walk
- Woburn Place
- Sicilian Avenue

== Books on Bloomsbury architecture ==
- Rasmussen, Sten Eiler. London: The Unique City. London: Penguin (Pelican), 1960.
