= Bloomsbury Square =

Garden square in Camden, London, England

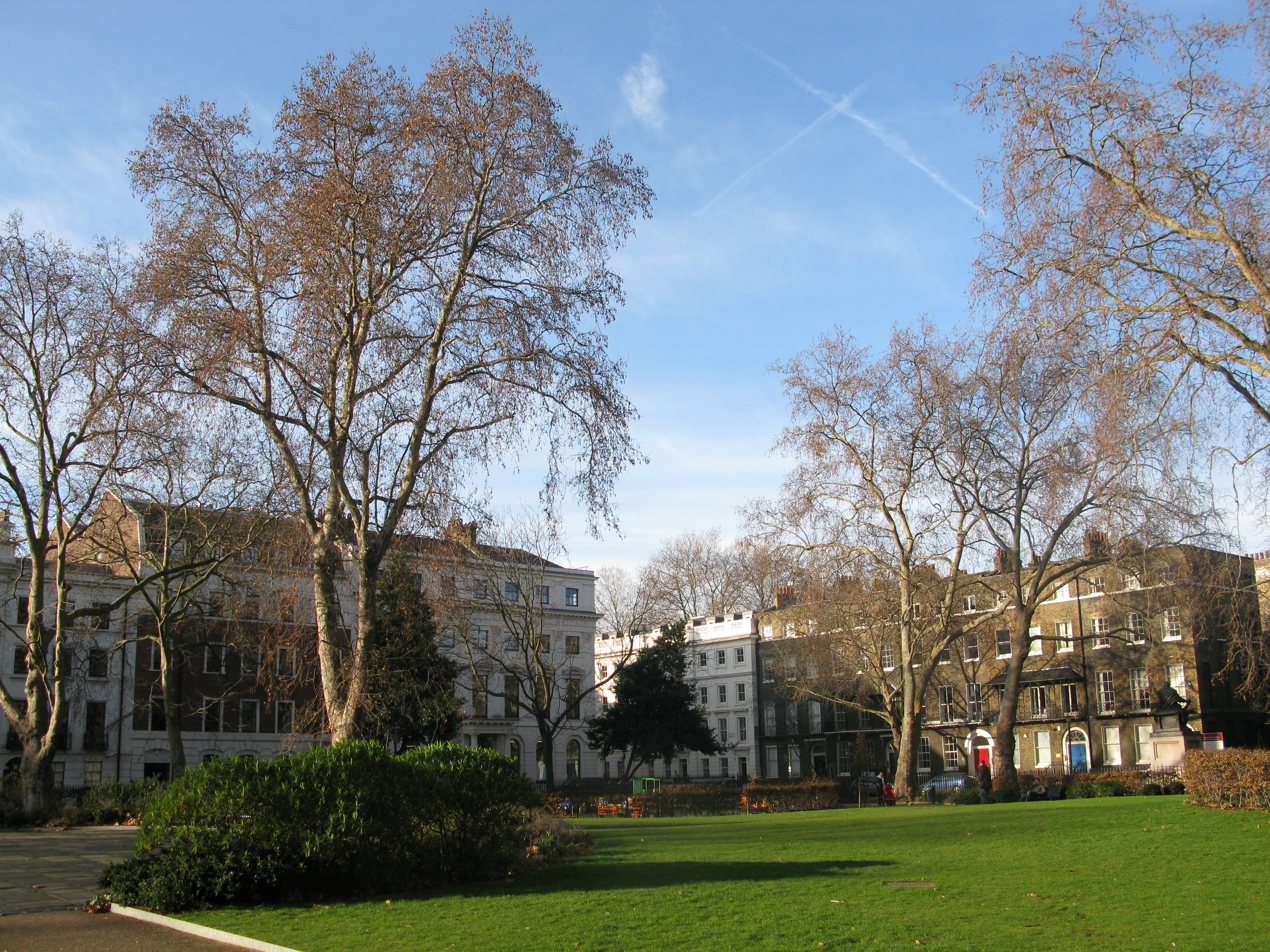

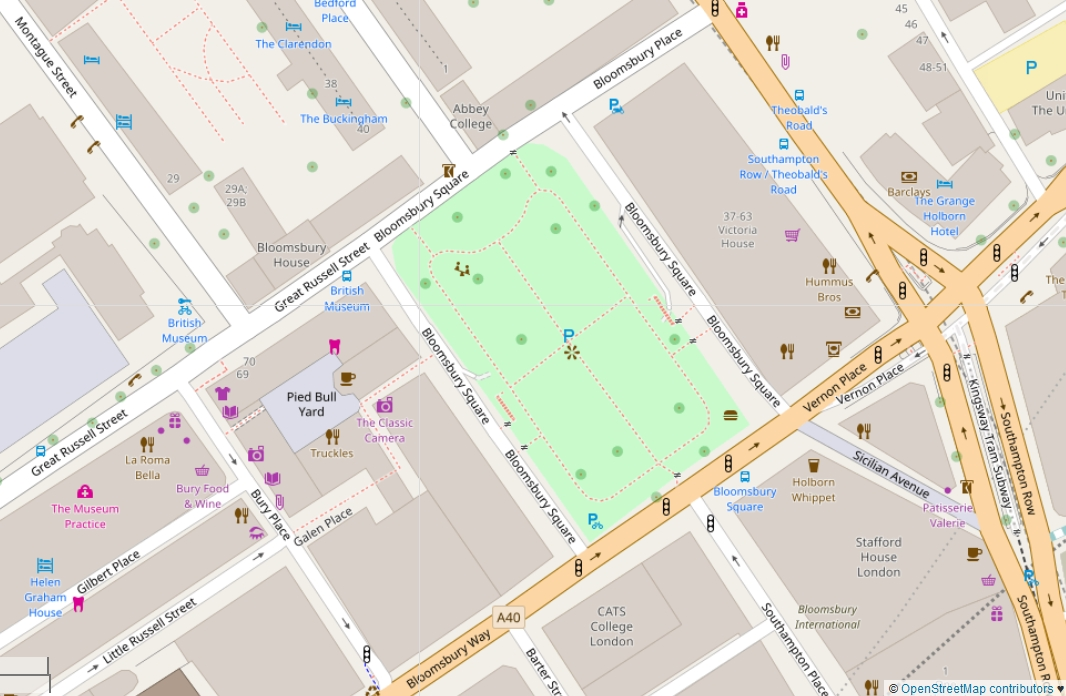
- Type: Garden square
- Location: London, WC1; United Kingdom
- Coordinates: 51°31′08″N 0°7′22″W
- Area: 0.5 hectares (1.24 acres)
- Created: Early 1660s
- Public transit: Holborn

Bloomsbury Square is a garden square in Bloomsbury, in the London Borough of Camden, London. Developed in the late 17th century, it was initially known as Southampton Square and was one of the earliest London squares. By the early 19th century, Bedford House along the north of the square had been demolished and replaced with terraced housing designed by James Burton.

== Geography ==
To the north of the square is Great Russell Street and Bedford Place, leading to Russell Square. To the south is Bloomsbury Way. To the west is the British Museum and Holborn is the nearest underground station to the southeast. There are gardens in the centre of the square.

== History ==
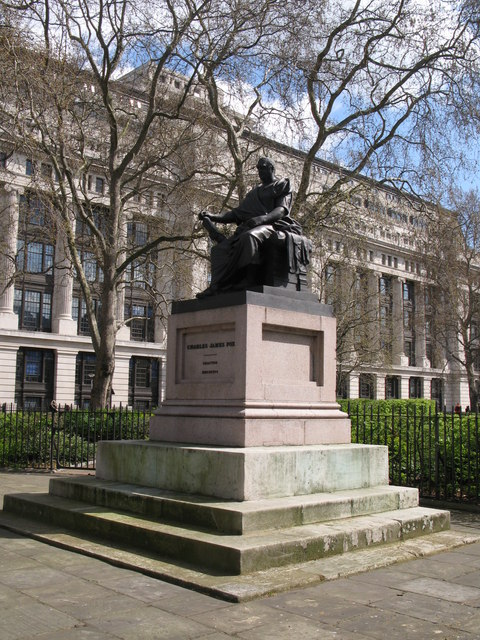
Charles James Fox Statue, Bloomsbury Square

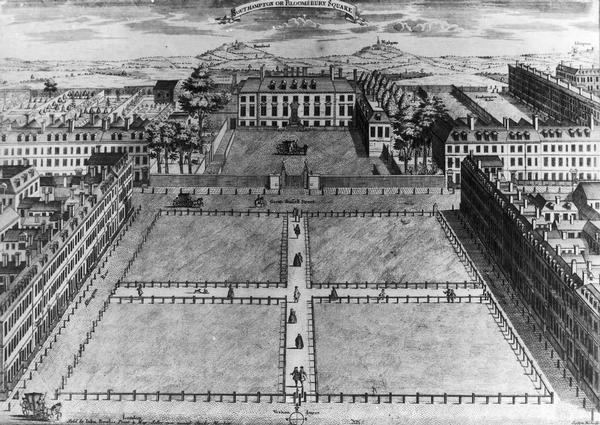
Bloomsbury Square and Bedford House looking north, circa 1725

The square was developed for the 4th Earl of Southampton in the early 1660s and was initially known as Southampton Square. It was one of the earliest London squares. The Earl's own house, then known as Southampton House and later as Bedford House after the square and the rest of the Bloomsbury Estate passed by marriage from the Earls of Southampton to the Dukes of Bedford, occupied the whole of the north side of the square, where Bedford Place is now located. The other sides were lined with typical terraced houses of the time, which were initially occupied by members of the aristocracy and gentry.

On 9 April 1694 Bloomsbury Square was the setting for an infamous duel. The then 23-year-old Scottish economist and financier John Law fought Edward 'Beau' Wilson, killing him with a single pass and thrust of his sword. Law would be convicted of murder and sentenced to death, but would escape his condemned cell and go on to become the founder of the Mississippi Company and the de facto prime minister of France.

By the early 19th century, Bloomsbury was no longer fashionable with the upper classes. Consequently, the Duke of Bedford of the day moved out of Bedford House, which was demolished and replaced with further terraced houses. In the 19th century the square was occupied mainly by middle class professionals. The writer Isaac D'Israeli lived at No. 6 from 1817 to 1829 and for part of that time his son, the future Prime Minister Benjamin Disraeli lived with him. In the 20th century most of the buildings came to be used as offices.

Bloomsbury Square's garden contains a bronze statue by Richard Westmacott of Charles James Fox, who was a Whig associate of the Dukes of Bedford. None of the original 17th-century buildings survive, but there are many handsome 18th- and early 19th-century houses. The Royal Pharmaceutical Society of Great Britain was based in an 18th-century building on the southern side of the square partly credited to John Nash. The eastern side of the square is occupied by a large early 20th-century office building called Victoria House, built for, and for many decades occupied by, Liverpool Victoria Friendly Society. The garden is open to the public and was refurbished in 2003.

The garden is Grade II listed on the Register of Historic Parks and Gardens.

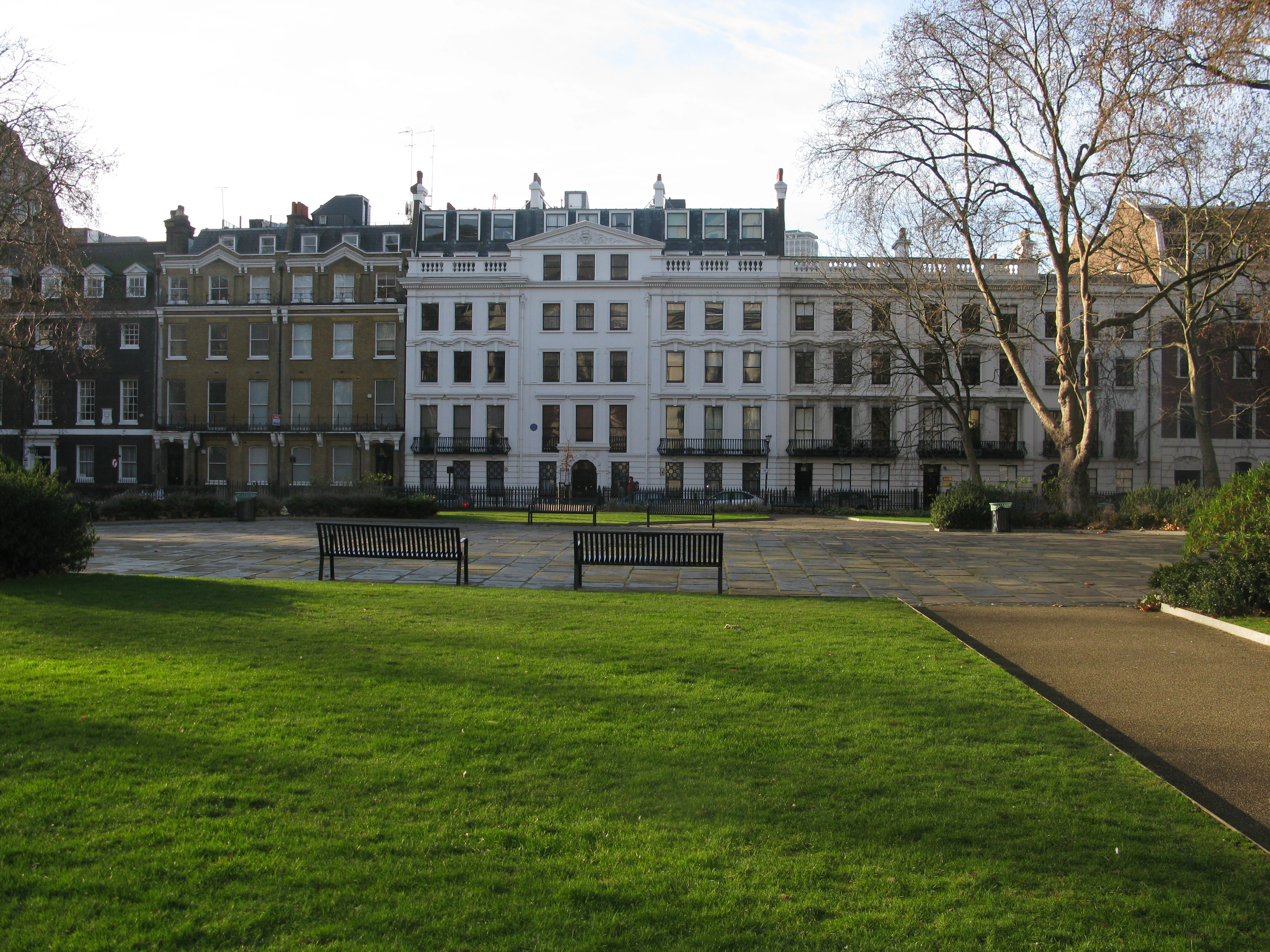
The west side of Bloomsbury Square in 2008

== In culture ==
- The second movement of Symphony No 2 (A London Symphony) by Vaughan Williams represents "Bloomsbury Square on a November Afternoon".
- In the musical Oliver!, Mr. Brownlow lives in Bloomsbury Square, while in Charles Dickens's Oliver Twist, on which the musical is based, he lives in Pentonville.

== Current occupants ==
- No. 5a Pushkin House
- No. 15 Le Cordon Bleu
- No. 17 German Historical Institute
- No. 18 The History of Parliament
- No. 19 19 Bloomsbury Square Psychoanalysis and Psychotherapy

== Former occupants ==
- No. 6 Isaac D'Israeli
- No. 29 Edwin Lutyens
- William Murray, 1st Earl of Mansfield
- Richard Steele
- No. 38 Samuel Shepherd
- No. 40 Gertrude Stein in 1902.

== See also ==
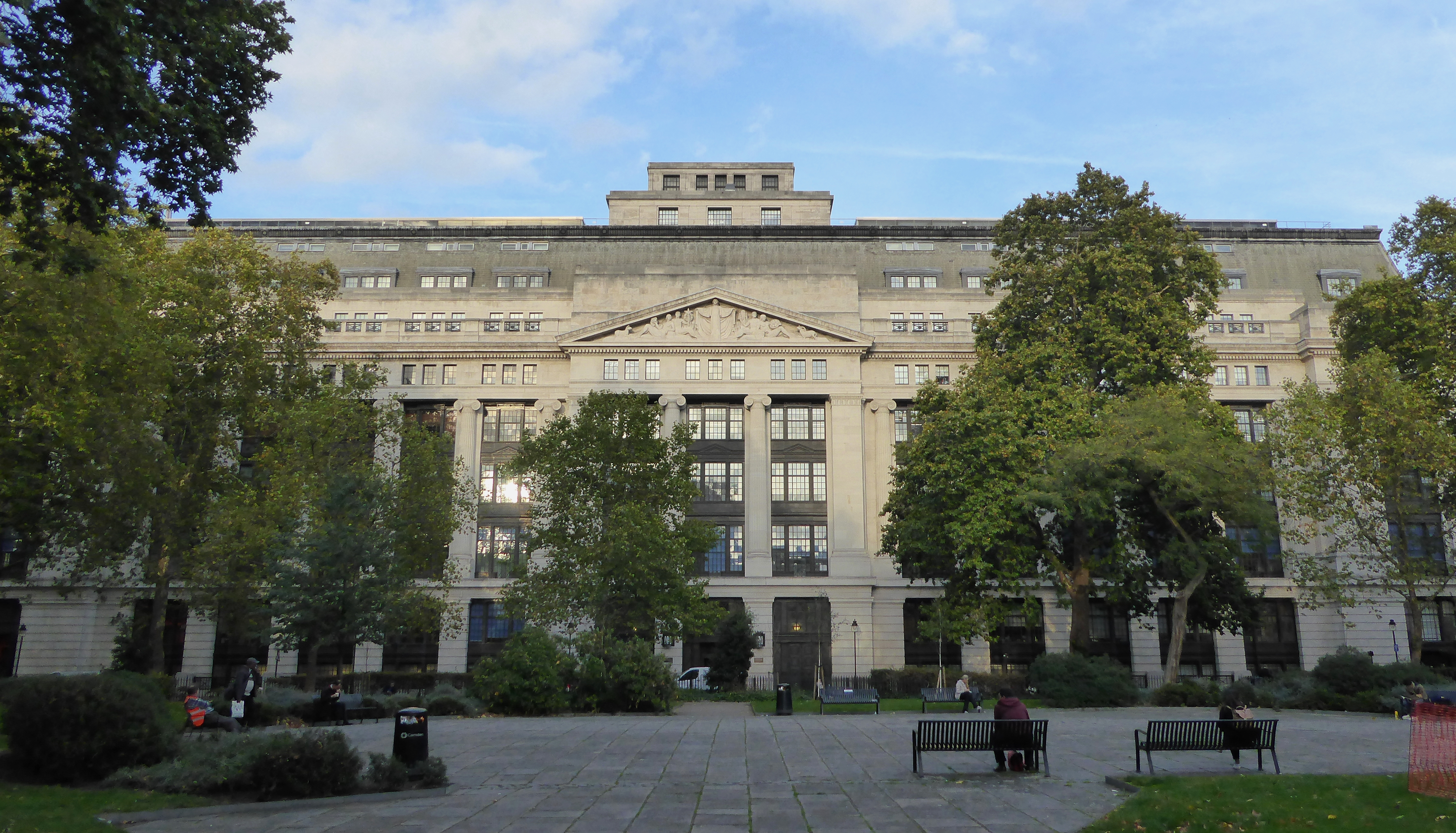
Victoria House as seen from Bloomsbury Square

Other squares on the Bedford Estate in Bloomsbury included:

- Bedford Square
- Gordon Square
- Mecklenburgh Square
- Russell Square
- Tavistock Square
- Torrington Square
- Woburn Square
