= Torrington Place =

Street in London, England

Coordinates: 51°31′18.83″N 0°8′2.43″W

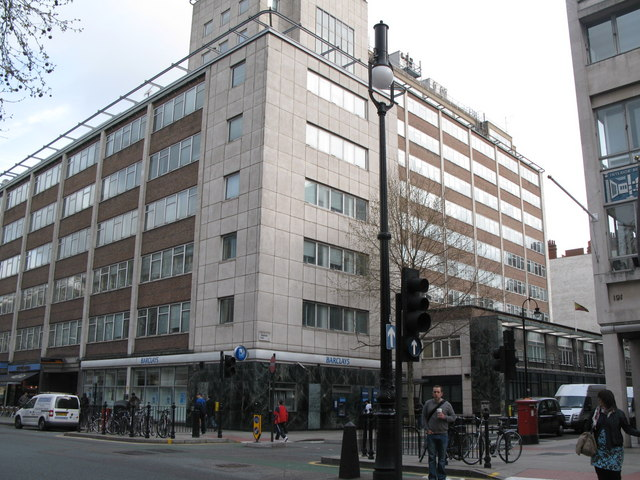
The corner of Tottenham Court Road and Torrington Place.

Torrington Place is a street in London that runs between Tottenham Court Road on the west side and Byng Place on the east side. Torrington Place is crossed by Huntley Street and Gower Street. Chenies Mews joins it on the north side and is continued by Ridgmount Gardens on the south side.

Until 1938, the part of Torrington Place between Tottenham Court Road and Gower Street was known as Francis Street; only the part from Gower Street to Malet Street was known as Torrington Place.
