= Gordon Square =

Public park in Bloomsbury, London, England

Coordinates: 51.5243°N 0.1309°W

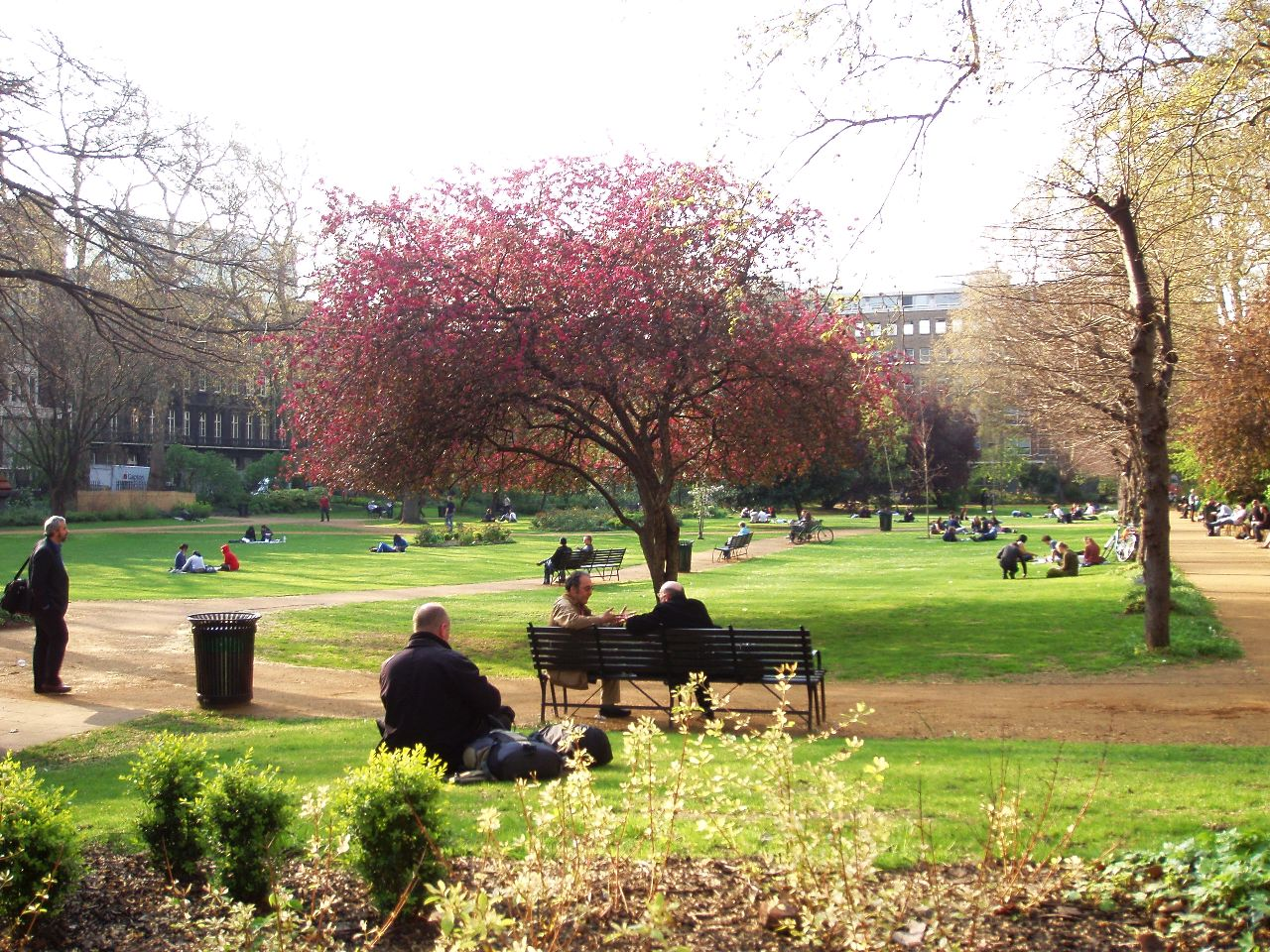
View of the centre of Gordon Square.

Gordon Square is a public park square in Bloomsbury, London, England. It is part of the Bedford Estate and was designed as one of a pair with the nearby Tavistock Square. It is owned by the University of London.

== History and buildings ==
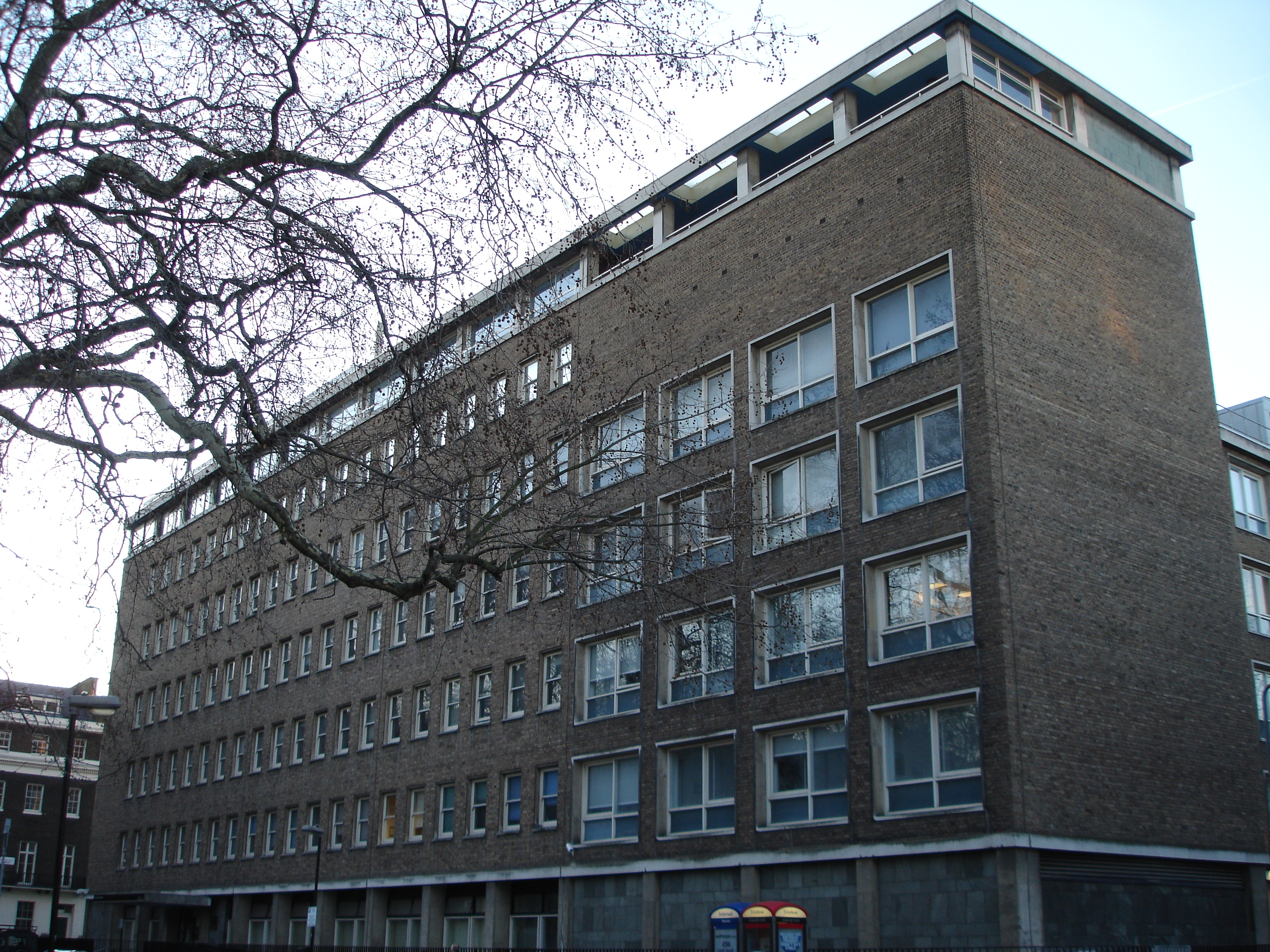
Institute of Archaeology, University College London, on the north side of the square.

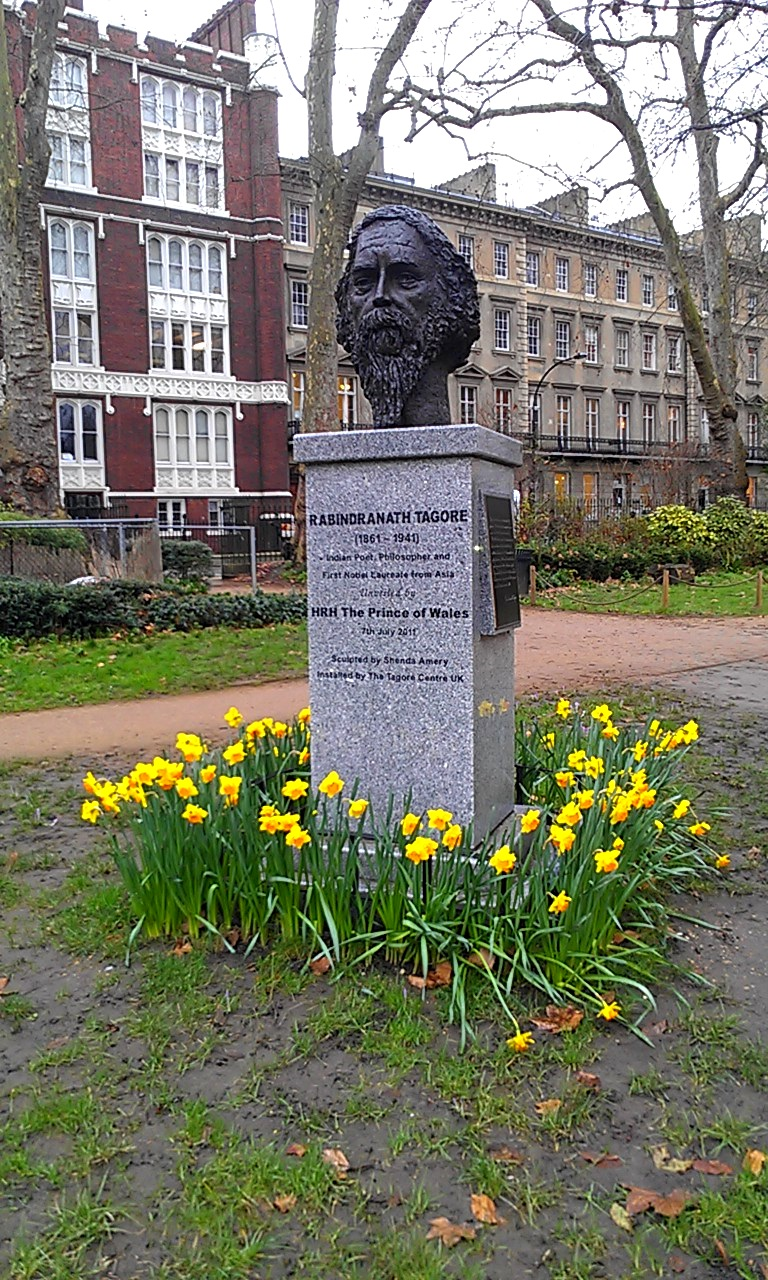
Bust of Tagore in Gordon Square.

The square was developed by master builder Thomas Cubitt in the 1820s, as one of a pair with Tavistock Square, which is a block away and has the same dimensions. As with most London squares the central garden was originally for the private use of the residents of the surrounding houses, but it now belongs to the University of London and is open to the public. The square is named after the second wife of the 6th Duke of Bedford, Lady Georgiana Gordon, daughter of Alexander Gordon, 4th Duke of Gordon. The university owns many of the buildings in the square and in early 2005 it submitted an application for a refurbishment of the square, including the reinstatement of railings similar to the originals. The work was completed in 2007. The west side of the square is dominated by the listed church of Christ the King and next to it the home of Dr Williams's Library.

The Institute of Archaeology, a department of University College London, is on the north side of the square. The Campaign for Science and Engineering and UCL Urban Laboratory resides in Gordon House, at the square's north-west corner. Gordon Street leads from the north-west corner with the Bloomsbury Theatre close by. The Warburg Institute (part of the School of Advanced Study) is located on the south-west corner of the square, across Tavistock Place.

Nos. 16–26, on the western side of the square, were not completed until 1855, and they represent some of the last buildings created by Thomas Cubitt. The buildings now mostly house UCL academic departments. For example, No. 22 houses the Department of Science and Technology Studies. No. 53, previously home to the Percival David Collection of Chinese art, is now the SOAS Doctoral Centre. No.16 was the location of the China Institute from 1938.

Passfield Hall, a halls of residence for undergraduates at the London School of Economics, is on the north side of the square.

== Notable residents ==
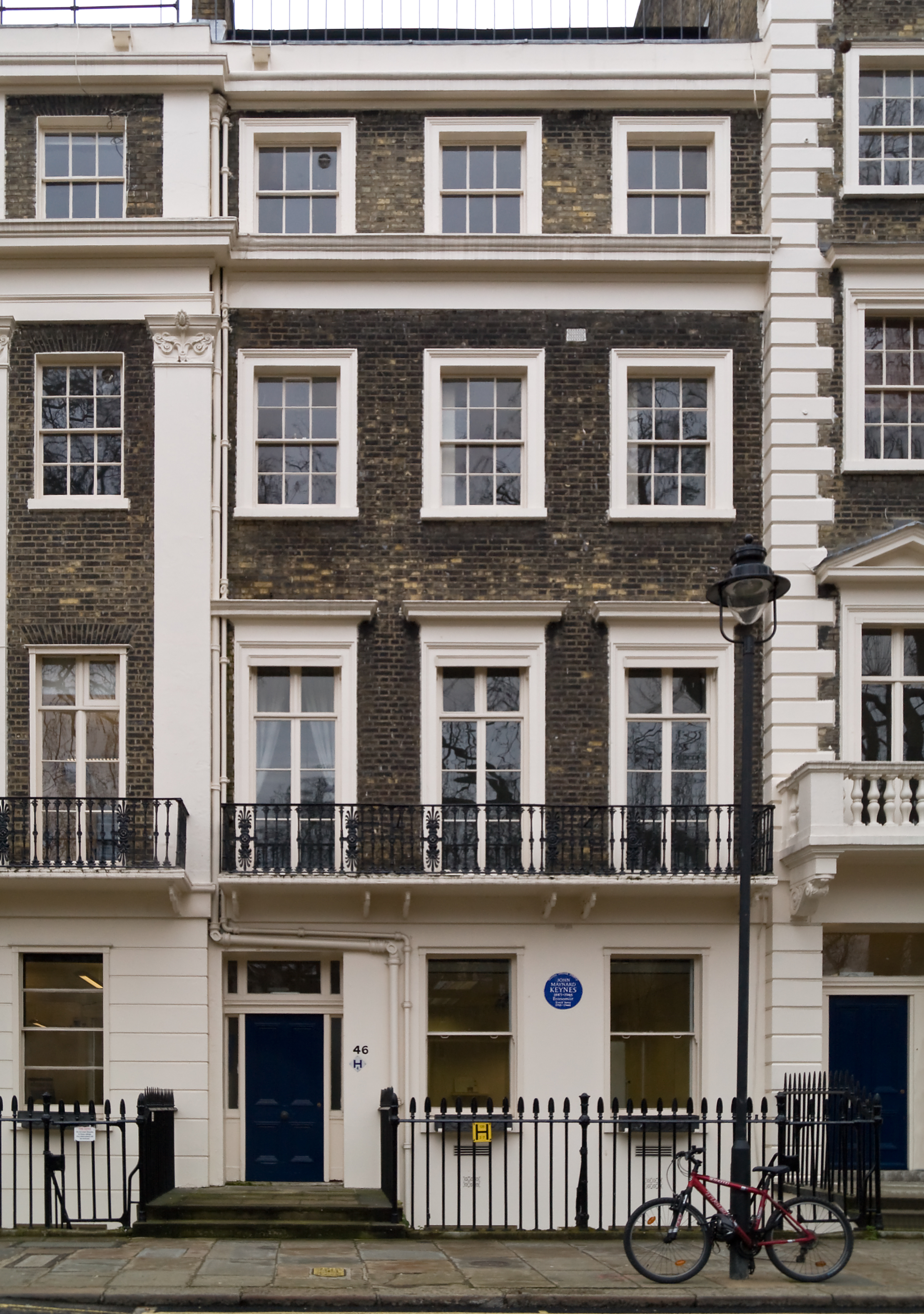
46 Gordon Square, where Virginia Woolf lived with her siblings from 1904 to 1907 (the first among the writer's five Bloomsbury addresses) and where John Maynard Keynes lived from 1916 to 1946.

The economist John Maynard Keynes (1883–1946) lived at 46 Gordon Square, marked by a blue plaque. Before Keynes moved in, the same house was occupied by a young Virginia Woolf (1882–1941) and her siblings (including the noted painter and interior designer Vanessa Bell) and frequented by other members of the Bloomsbury Group. The writer and biographer Lytton Strachey lived at No. 51. Houses 43 to 46 are now occupied by the School of Arts, Birkbeck, University of London.

== See also ==
Other squares on the Bedford Estate in Bloomsbury included:

- Bedford Square
- Bloomsbury Square
- Russell Square
- Tavistock Square
- Torrington Square
- Woburn Square
