= Bedford Estate =

Estate in central London, England

Coordinates: 51.5193°N 0.1248°W

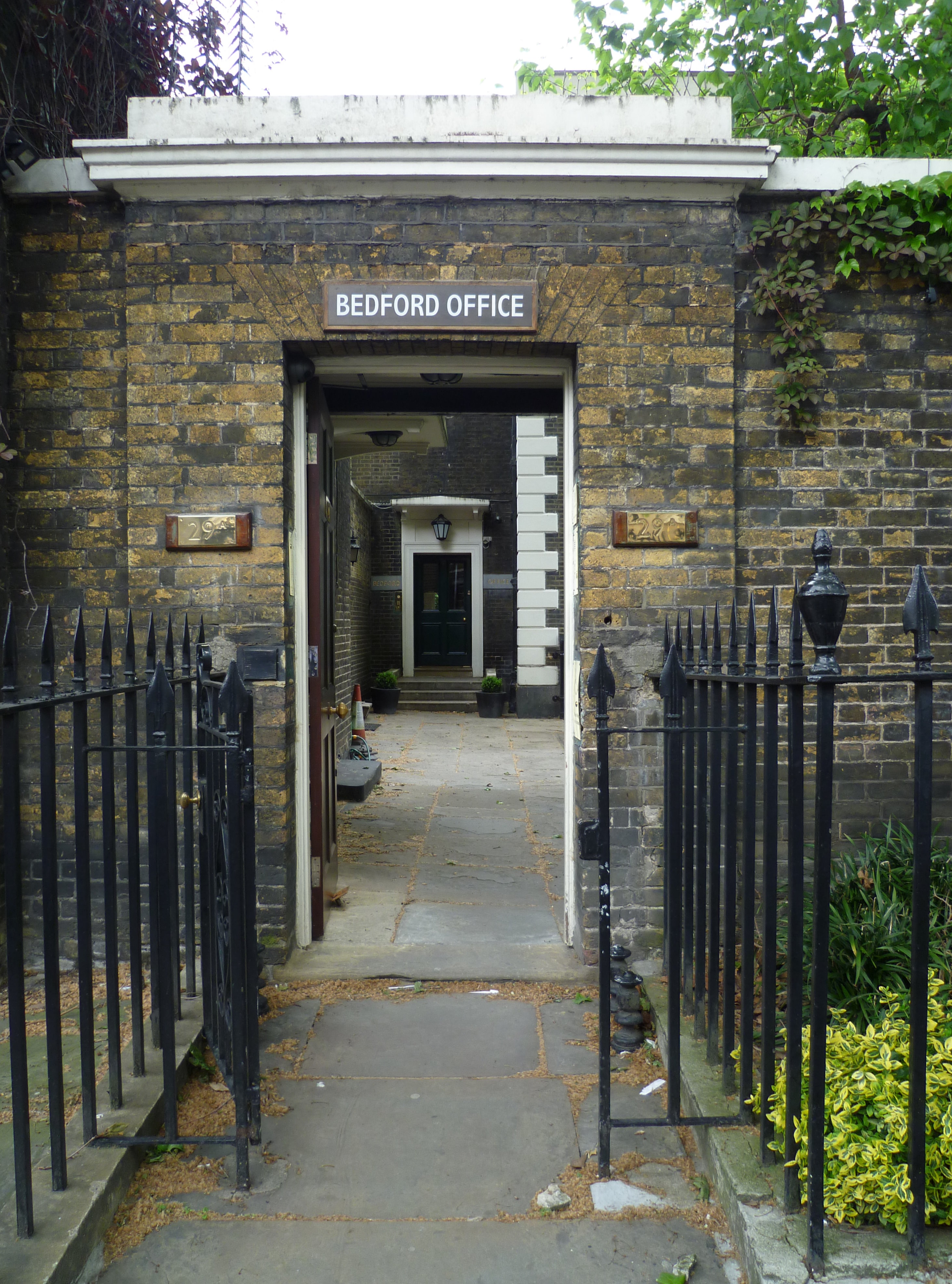
Entrance to the Bedford Estate office in Montague Street

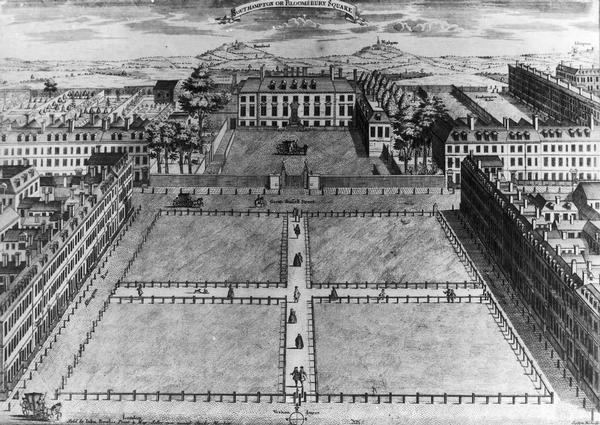
Looking north across Bloomsbury Square on the Bedford Estate with Bedford House behind, c. 1725, London town house of the Dukes of Bedford

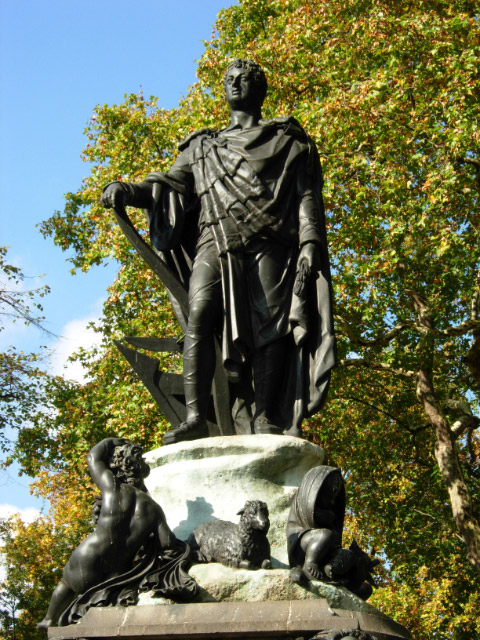
Francis Russell, 5th Duke of Bedford, statue by Richard Westmacott in Russell Square on the Bedford Estate

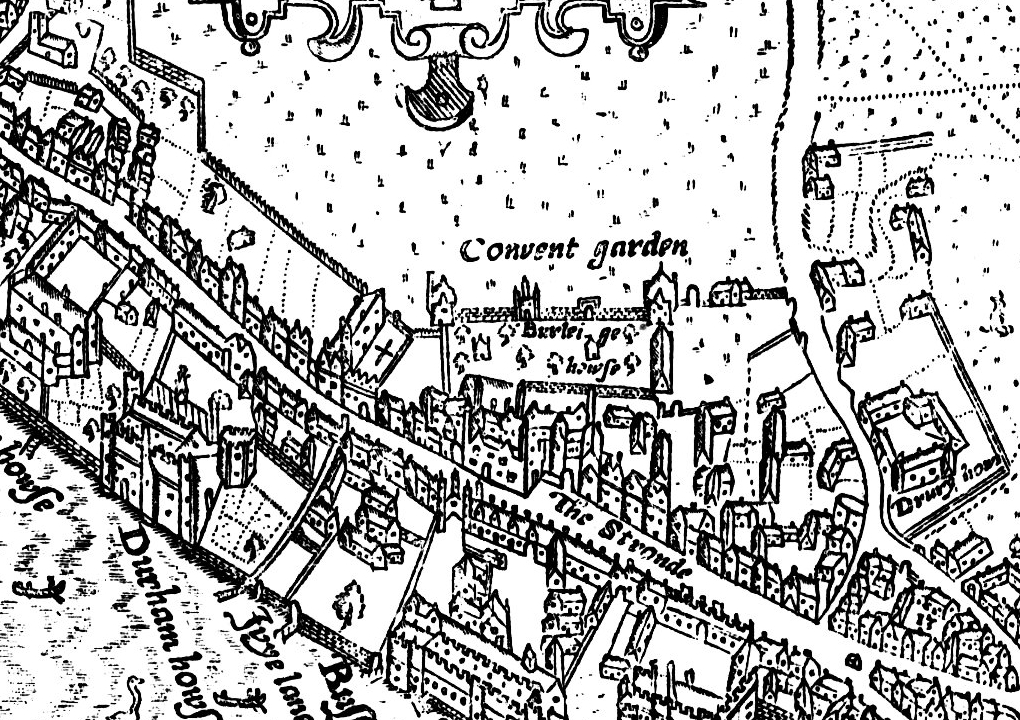
John Norden's map of 1593 map, showing the Bedford Covent Garden Estate not long after it was acquired by John Russell, 1st Earl of Bedford (c. 1485–1554/55), granted by King Henry VIII after the dissolution of the monasteries in 1540

The Bedford Estate is an estate in central London owned by the Russell family, which holds the peerage title of Duke of Bedford. The estate was originally based in Covent Garden, then stretched to include Bloomsbury in 1669. The Covent Garden property was sold for £2 million in 1913 by Herbrand Russell, 11th Duke of Bedford, to the MP and land speculator Harry Mallaby-Deeley, who sold his option to the Beecham family for £250,000; the sale was finalised in 1918.

== History ==
In 1669, the Bloomsbury Estate came into ownership of the Russell family when William, son of William Russell, 1st Duke and 5th Earl of Bedford (1616–1700), married Lady Rachel Vaughan, one of the daughters of Thomas Wriothesley, 4th Earl of Southampton (1607–1667). She had recently inherited the agricultural fields now known as Bloomsbury from her father.

Francis Russell, 5th Duke of Bedford (1765–1802) came of age in 1786. He was a spendthrift gambler, with an interest in farming on the Woburn estate. However, he was not interested in Bedford House in Bloomsbury, instead living in the West End. In 1800, the contents of Bedford House were put up for auction and the house was demolished. It was replaced by a wide avenue, Bedford Place, leading north to the large Russell Square, with Montague Street running parallel to the west. Francis Russell commissioned James Burton, the pre-eminent property developer of Georgian London, to develop the land into a residential area in which Russell Square would be the focal point, and which would be landscaped by Humphrey Repton, who had impressed Francis Russell with his work on the Woburn estate.

The development of Bloomsbury was continued by Francis Russell's brother, John Russell, 6th Duke of Bedford (1766–1839). The firm of Thomas Cubitt (1788–1855) were involved towards the end of the development. Eventually, the entire estate north of Russell Square was filled with squares and houses. John Russell was also responsible for the building of the Covent Garden Market to the south of the main estate.

Herbrand Russell, 11th Duke of Bedford (1858–1940) succeeded to the title in 1893. By then, there was a move against the owners of large estates. Herbrand Russell began to sell off the estates under his control. The sale contract for Covent Garden was signed in 1914 and finalised with Sir Thomas Beecham (1879–1961) in 1918.

== The Bedford Estates ==
The British Museum and the University of London replaced large parts of the estate and the remnants are owned by The Bedford Estates, mainly residential property that has been converted for office and hotel use, together with private residential property. The company is the largest private landowner in Bloomsbury and is managed from the Bedford Office in Montague Street, within the estate.

== Geography ==
The main Bedford Estate originally extended between Tottenham Court Road, Euston Road, Southampton Row, and New Oxford Street. There were also two separate parts on the other side of Tottenham Court Road and Euston Road. To the south, the Covent Garden Estate north of the Strand was also part of the Bedford Estate.

Garden squares in the main Bedford Estate include:

- Bedford Square
- Bloomsbury Square
- Gordon Square
- Russell Square
- Tavistock Square
- Torrington Square
- Woburn Square

In the northern separate part of the Bedford Estate is Harrington Square. The neighbouring Ampthill Square Estate is built on what was previously another garden square, Ampthill Square.

== See also ==
- Covent Garden Estate

Other large privately owned historic estates in London include:

- Cadogan Estates
- Portman Estate
- Grosvenor Estate
- Howard de Walden Estate
- Langham Estate
- Smith's Charity Estate (South Kensington, SW7)
- Pettiward Estate (West Brompton, SW10)
- Peabody Trust (1862, charity)
- Ilchester Estate, Kensington (see Holland House)
- Naru Estate
