= Malet Street =

Street in Bloomsbury, London

Coordinates: 51.5214°N 0.1302°W

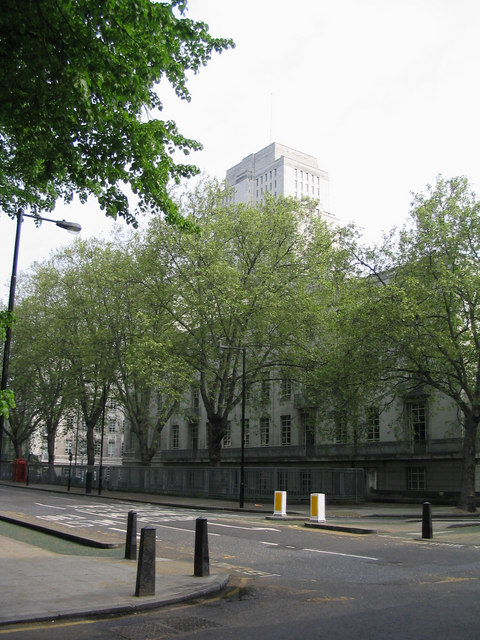
Malet Street and Senate House

Malet Street is a street in Bloomsbury, in the London Borough of Camden, Central London, England. It runs between Torrington Place and the British Museum, parallel to Gower Street and Tottenham Court Road.

== History ==
The street is named after Sir Edward Malet who was married to Lady Ermyntrude Sackville Russell, daughter of Francis Russell, 9th Duke of Bedford who owned much of the surrounding area.

== Buildings ==
It is a small street, but is notable for being the location of Senate House, the main building of the University of London, the London School of Hygiene and Tropical Medicine, Birkbeck Central (formerly Student Central London, and before that the University of London Union), College Hall and the Royal Academy of Dramatic Art. Birkbeck, University of London is also on the street, though its entrance is now in Torrington Square.

In 1938, the Institute of Education moved from Southampton Row to the University of London Senate House complex on Malet Street.

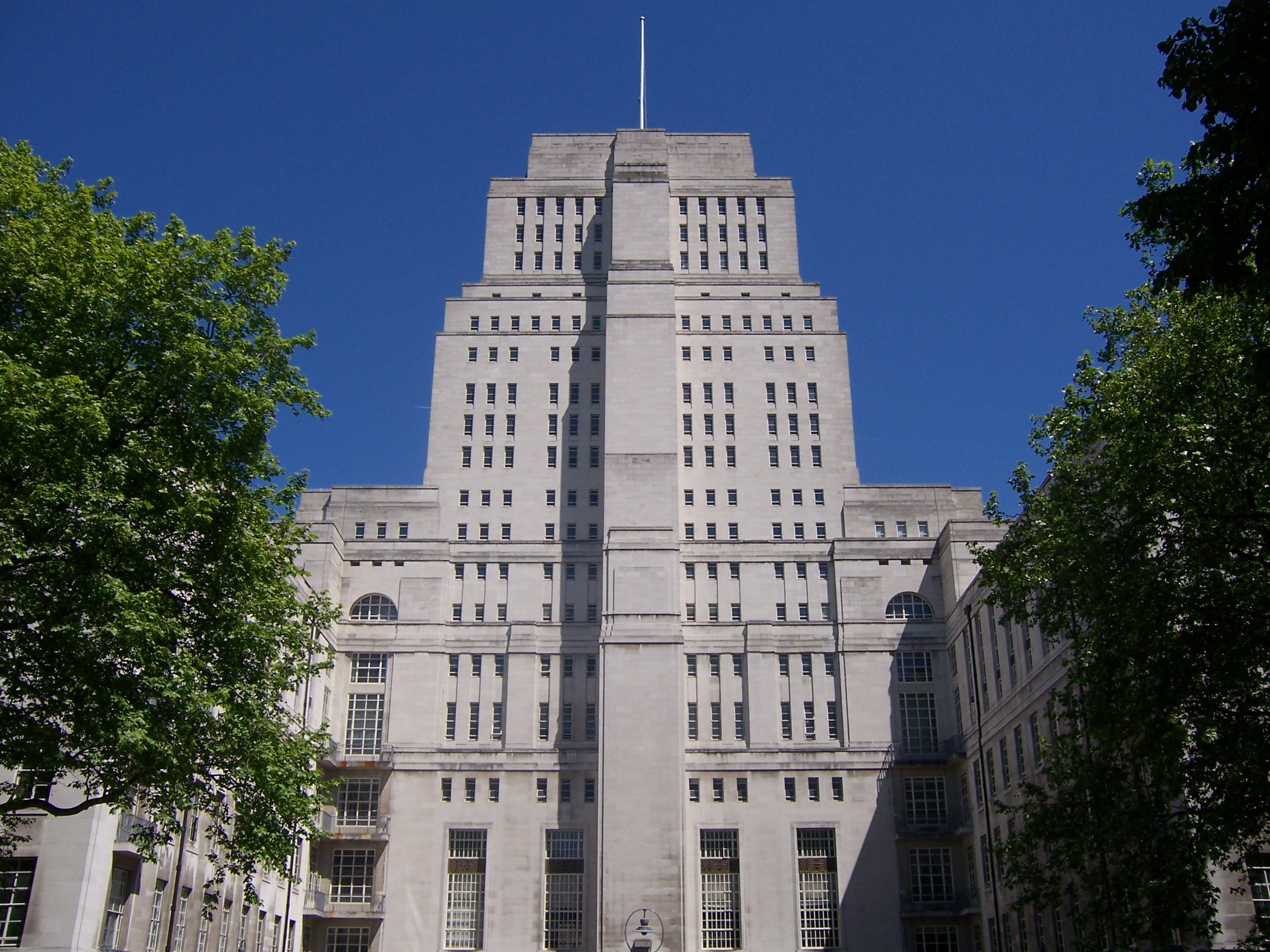
Senate House

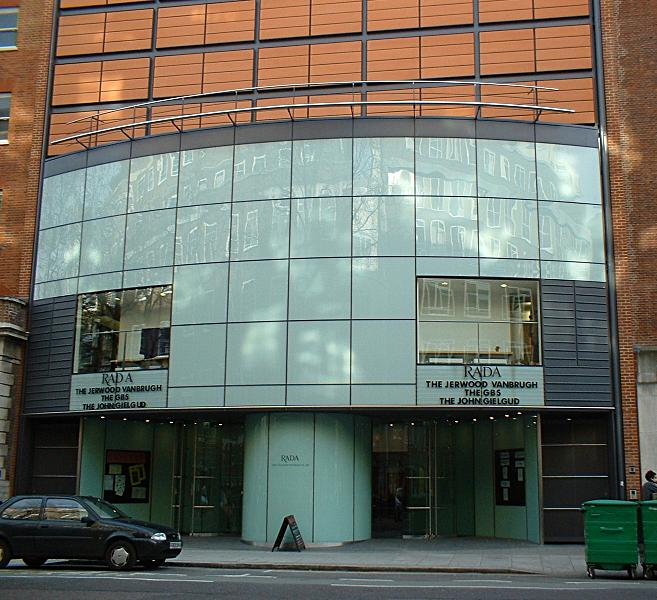
Royal Academy of Dramatic Art

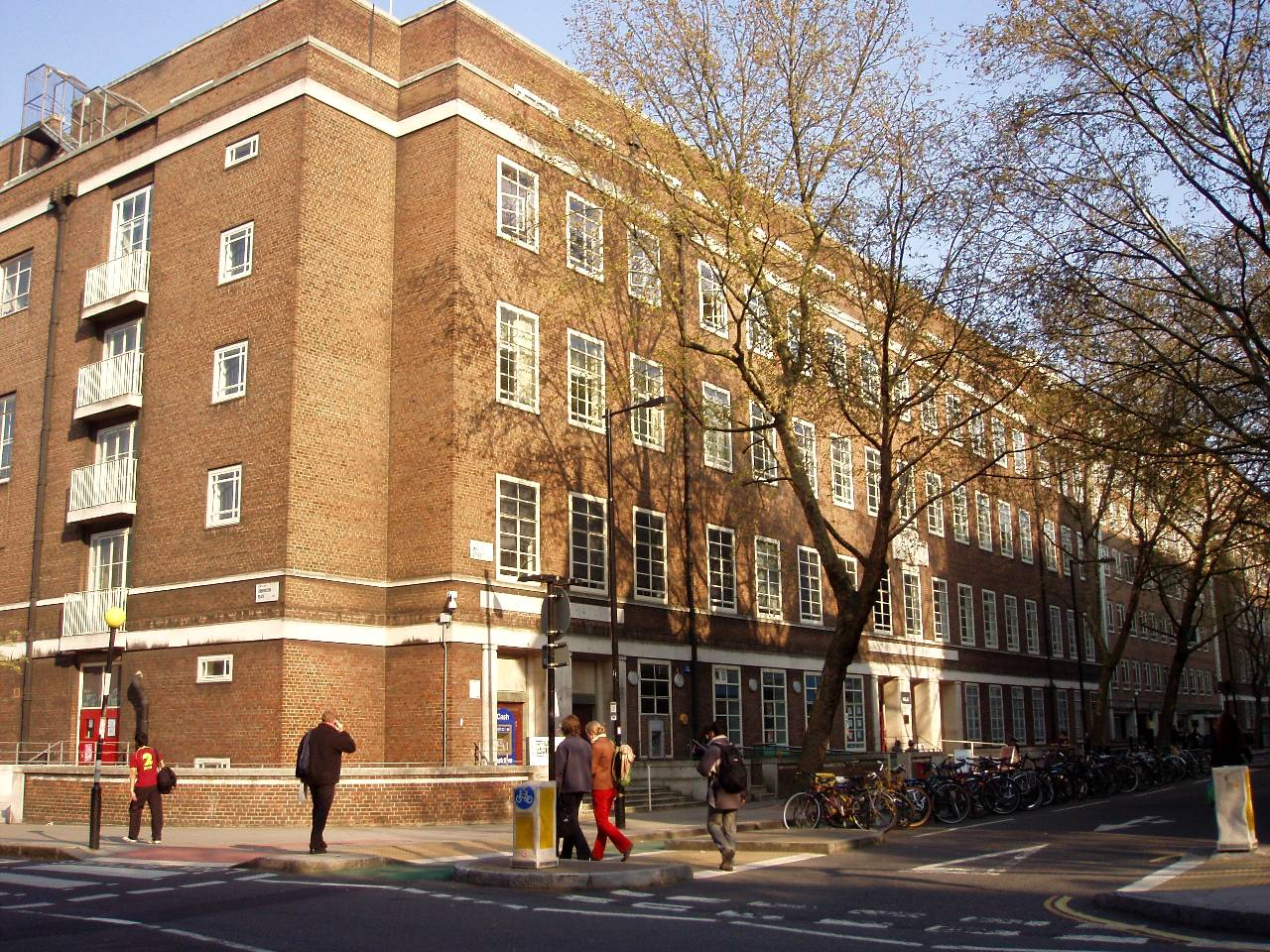
Birkbeck Central (formerly University of London Union)

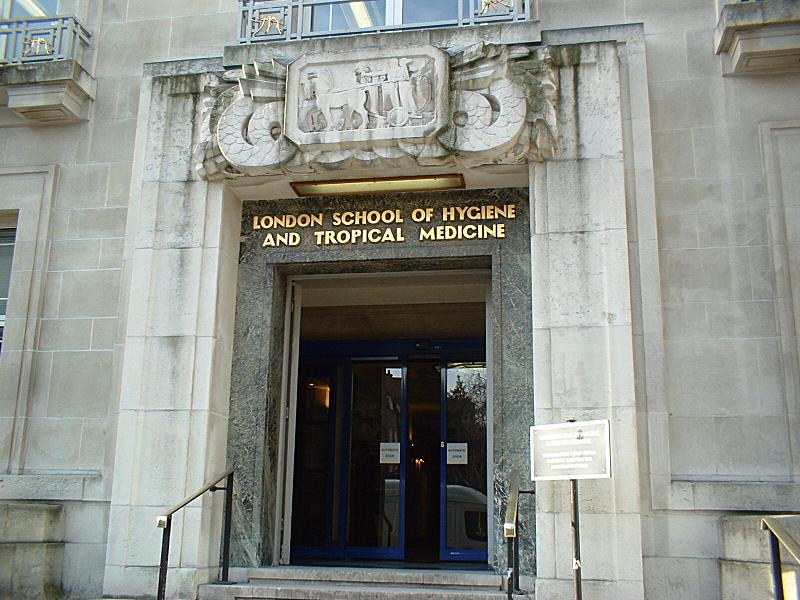
London School of Hygiene and Tropical Medicine
