= Huntley Street =

Street in Bloomsbury, London

Coordinates: 51°31′19.33″N 0°8′1.21″W

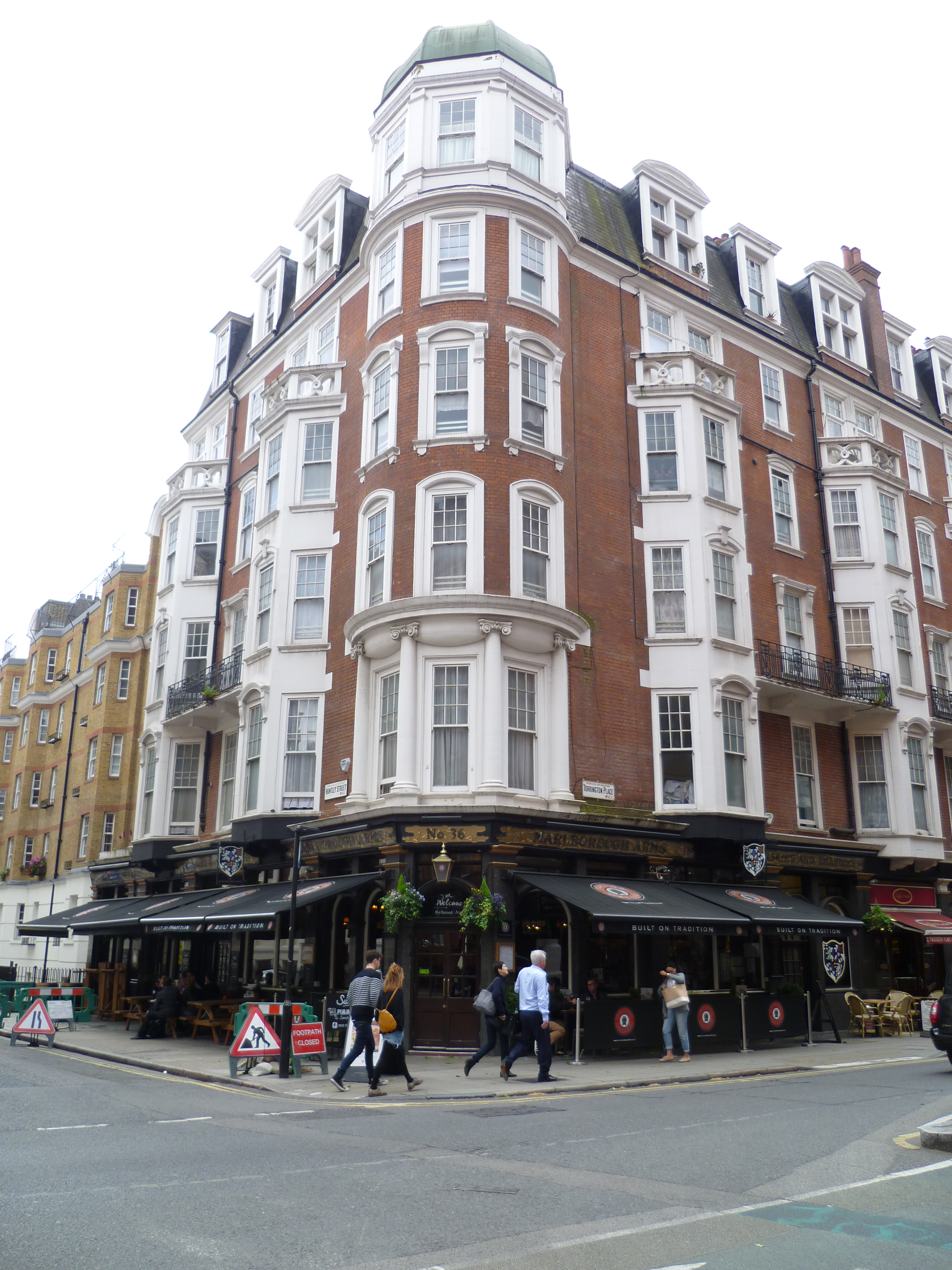
The Marlborough Arms at the corner of Huntley Street and Torrington Place

Huntley Street is a street in Bloomsbury, London, known for its close association with University College Hospital.

== Location ==
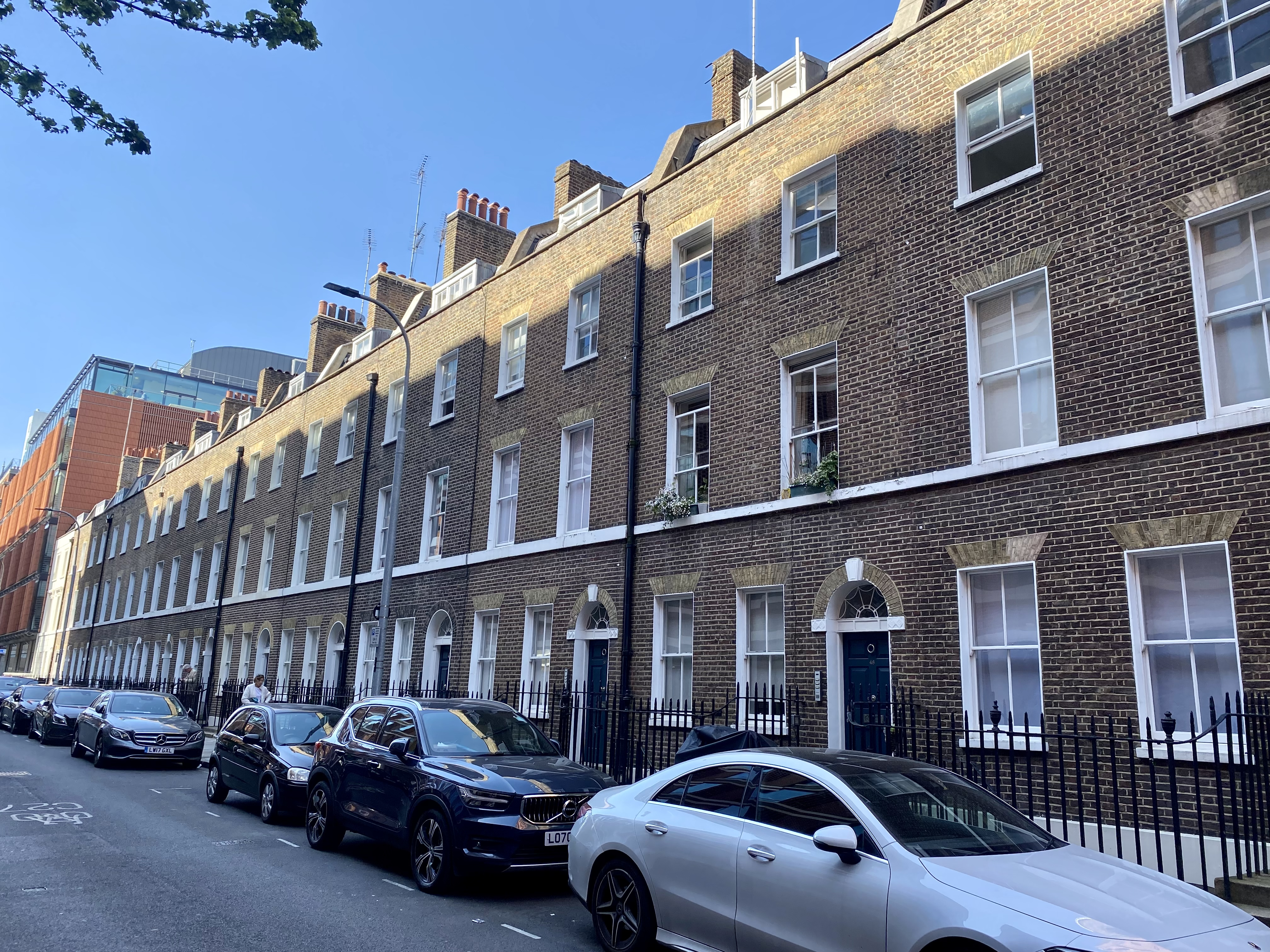
46-68 Huntley Street, May 2023

Huntley Street runs from Grafton Way in the north to Chenies Street in the south. It runs parallel with Tottenham Court Road and Gower Street. It is crossed by University Street and Torrington Place. Capper Street and Chenies Mews join it halfway down. The southern part of the street is dominated by residential mansion blocks while the northern part of the street has more commercial and hospital buildings. The Marlborough Arms public house is on the corner with Torrington Place and The Jeremy Bentham on the corner with University Street.

== Hospital buildings ==
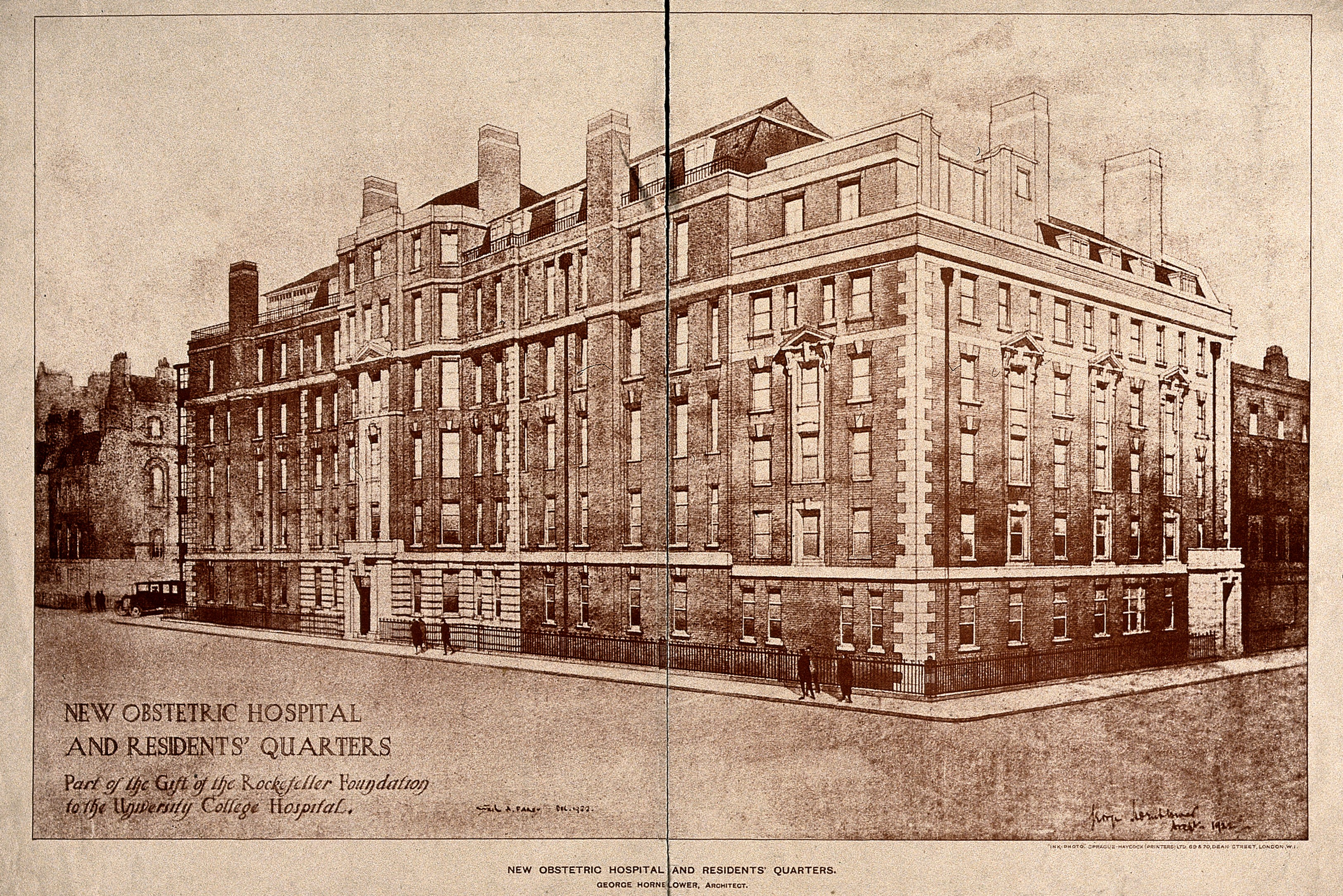
University College Hospital, London: the Maternity Hospital and Nurses' home, Huntley Street. Photo-lithograph, 1923, after C. A. Farey, 1922.

The northern part of the street is dominated by buildings related to University College Hospital (UCH). The rear of the UCH Cruciform Building is on the corner of the street with Grafton Way. Opposite is the Rosenheim Building and further down the street on the same side is the UCH Macmillan Cancer Centre. The Paul O'Gorman Building is on the east side. The West side now hosts the new Royal National Ear Nose and Throat and Eastman Dental Hospitals, part of UCL Hospitals NHS Trust, following closure of their former buildings on Gray's Inn Road.

== Squats ==
In 1977, five blocks of empty flats were squatted on Huntley Street by the Squatters Action Council. 160 people moved in and resisted eviction, until they were removed by an operation of 650 police in August 1978.

== Chenies Street Chambers ==
At the southern end on the western side is Chenies Street Chambers which once had its entrance in Chenies Street. Following bombing during the Second World War, the main entrance to the building is now in Huntley Street. The building was originally designed as flats for single professional women, but is now social housing.
