= Helen Wickstead =

Helen Wickstead FSA
- Occupations: Senior Lecturer and Course Director at Kingston School of Art

Academic work
- Discipline: Archaeology

Helen Wickstead FSA MCIfA FHEA is a British archaeologist, museologist, and is Senior Lecturer at Kingston University.

== Biography ==
Wickstead has a PhD from University College London in 2007 with a thesis titled "Land division and identity in later prehistoric Dartmoor, south-west Britain: Translocating tenure".

Her research includes history of archaeology, including biographical work on individuals including: Doris Emerson Chapman, on her work at Avebury; O. G. S. Crawford on his role as Archaeology Officer of the Ordnance Survey; and George Witt's 'Collection Illustrative of Phallic Worship', held at the British Museum's 'Secretum'.

In 2013, Helen Wickstead and Martyn Barber excavated long barrows at Damerham in Hampshire.

On 18 November 2021 she was elected as a Fellow of the Society of Antiquaries of London.

== Select publications ==
- Wickstead, H. (2009). "The Uber Archaeologist: Art, GIS and the male gaze revisited: Art, GIS and the male gaze revisited". Journal of Social Archaeology, 9(2), 249-271. doi:10.1177/1469605309104138
- Wickstead, H. (2013) "Between the Lines: Drawing Archaeology", in Paul Graves-Brown, Rodney Harrison, and Angela Piccini (eds), The Oxford Handbook of the Archaeology of the Contemporary World. doi:10.1093/oxfordhb/9780199602001.013.012
- Wickstead, H. (2020). "The phallus in the closet: collecting and classifying ancient sculpture", in Joseph-Lester, Jaspar, (ed.), Everything is sculpture. Royal College of Art
