= Damerham =

Village and parish in Hampshire, England

Coordinates: 50.942°N 1.852°W

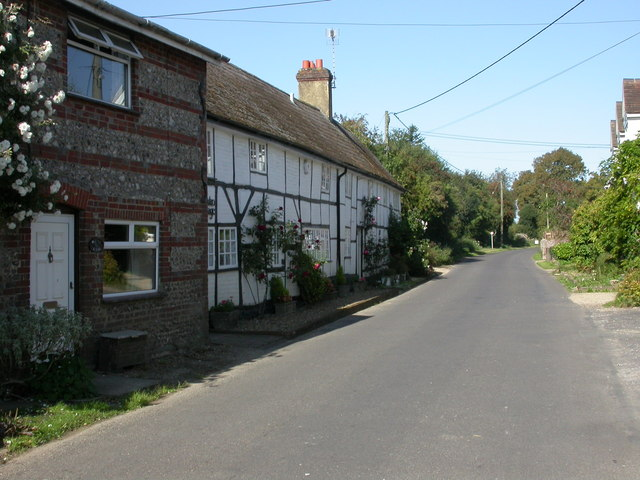
- Damerham

- Location within Hampshire
- Population: 519; 508 (2011 Census including Lopshill and Lower Daggons)
- OS grid reference: SU105158
- District: New Forest
- Shire county: Hampshire
- Region: South East
- Country: England
- Sovereign state: United Kingdom
- Post town: FORDINGBRIDGE
- Postcode district: SP6
- Dialling code: 01725
- Police: Hampshire and Isle of Wight
- Fire: Hampshire and Isle of Wight
- Ambulance: South Central
- UK Parliament: New Forest West
- Website: www.damerham.net

Damerham is a rural village and civil parish in the New Forest district of Hampshire, England, near Fordingbridge. The area has notable Neolithic and Bronze Age barrows. It was the site of an Anglo-Saxon religious community, mentioned in the will of Alfred the Great. By the time of Domesday Book (1086), Damerham was a major settlement in the possession of Glastonbury Abbey. The village has a riverside mill and a Norman church.

== Geography ==
Damerham lies in the valley of the Allen River, a minor tributary of the Hampshire Avon. The river flows north-west to south-east across the parish, and becomes the Ashford Water as it continues east to join the Avon just below Fordingbridge.

The village is about 3 miles (5 km) north-west of Fordingbridge and is connected to nearby settlements by minor roads. The county boundary with Dorset follows the south-west and south boundaries of the parish.

== History ==
Settled since Saxon times, Damerham (anciently South Damerham) is said to be the birthplace of Æthelflæd, wife of Edmund I. Adam of Damerham (13th century), the author of Historia de Rebus gestis Glastoniensibus, was a native.

=== Prehistory ===
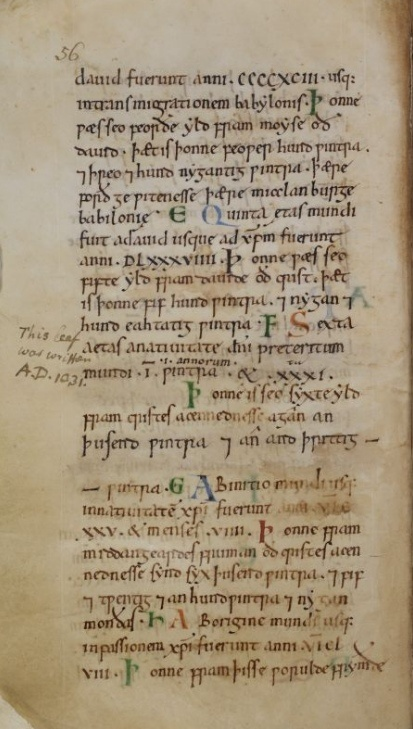
Will of Alfred the Great, AD 873–888, mentions Domrahamme (11th-century copy, British Library Stowe MS 944, ff. 29v–33r)

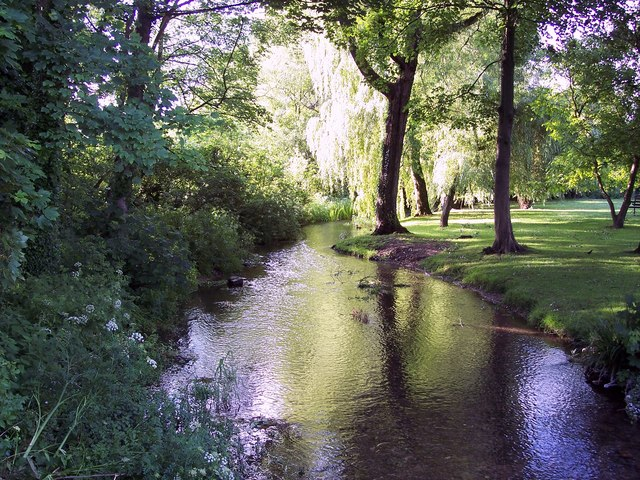
River Allen at Damerham

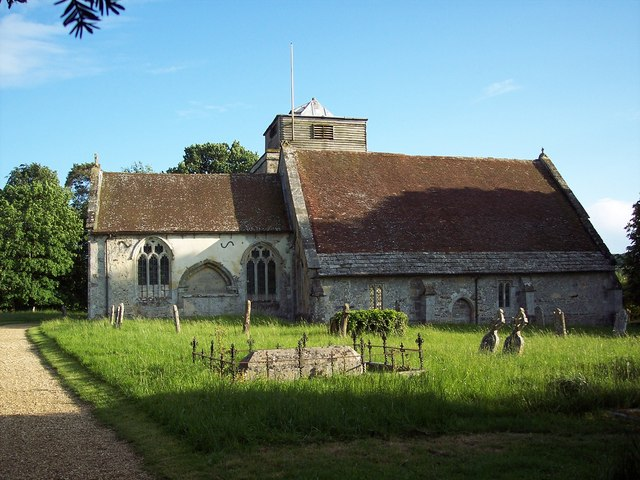
St George's Church

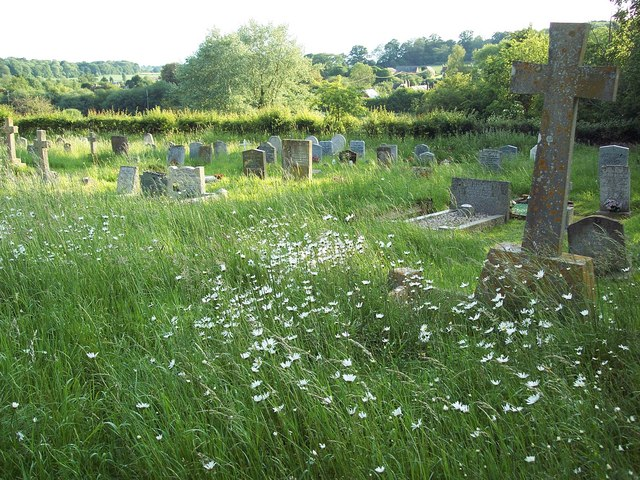
The churchyard

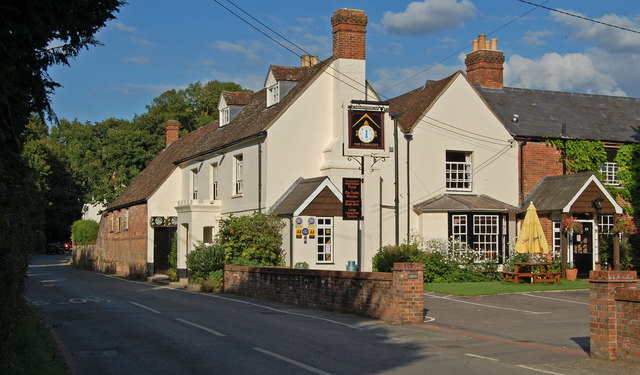
The Compasses inn

Damerham is the site of a prehistoric complex including two 6,000-year-old tombs representing some of the earliest monuments built in Britain. It was discovered by a team led by Helen Wickstead, a Kingston University archaeologist. These were previously undiscovered Neolithic tombs known as long barrows.

Another earthwork, Soldiers Ring, situated on a crest in an area of Celtic fields, is thought to be a Romano-British cattle enclosure.

Damerham was a royal estate of the kings of Wessex, and a religious community there was mentioned in the will of Alfred the Great: "And it is my will that the community at Damerham be given their landbooks and their freedom to choose whatever lord as is dearest to them, for my sake and for Ælfflæd." It may have been a nunnery headed by Ælfflæd, possibly a kinswoman of the king. In 940–6 Edmund I granted a hundred mansae at Damerham with Martin and Pentridge to his queen, Æthelflæd. Damerham may have been the birthplace of Æthelflæd. Æthelflæd bequeathed Damerham to Glastonbury Abbey when she died in the late 10th century.

=== Domesday ===
In the time of Domesday Book (1086), Damerham was a large settlement of 80 households. Glastonbury Abbey still held the manor, which remained with the abbey until the Dissolution of the Monasteries. It then passed to the Crown, and in 1540 Henry VIII leased part of the demesne land and certain farms belonging to the manor for 21 years to Richard Snell – these premises were in 1608 granted to Robert Cecil, 1st Earl of Salisbury, and remained with his descendants. In 1544 Henry VIII granted the manor of Damerham to his sixth wife, Catherine Parr, but it passed back to the Crown on her death in 1548. In 1575 Elizabeth I granted it to the Bishop of Salisbury, and, except for the temporary sale by Parliament to William Lytton in 1649, it remained in the possession of successive bishops until 1863. In 1565, Damerham was the birthplace of a noted translator and book collector, Robert Ashley.

Another important manor was the manor of Little Damerham which was owned by Glastonbury Abbey. Glastonbury Abbey also held lands in the manors of Hyde and Stapleham. Some of these lands were also held by Cranborne Priory, and Tewkesbury Abbey, to which Cranborne Priory was a cell. The hide at Lopshill (Lopushale) is mentioned as within the boundaries of the manor of Damerham in 940–6; it is now Lopshill Farm, in the south of the parish.

The Domesday Book records four mills at Damerham. One was given to Geoffrey Fitz-Ellis by John, Abbot of Glastonbury (1274–90). In 1326 Henry Dotenel released to the Abbot of Glastonbury all his claim in a water-mill called Weremulle in Damerham. In the survey of the manor taken in 1518 a water-mill called Lytellmyle is mentioned. This mill probably stood near Littlemill Bridge at North End, but it has now disappeared. In 1608 "all the water-mills of Damerham" were granted to Robert Earl of Salisbury. The only mill now in existence in the parish is Damerham Mill in the village on the River Allen.

=== Later history ===
Damerham Park is mentioned in 1226–1227 and in 1283, and at the latter date it contained deer. In 1518 the park, which contained 125 acres of wood, divided into three coppices: Edmundshay, Middle Coppis, and Drakenorth Coppis. It was apparently disparked before 1540.

The Church of Saint George dates from the Norman period. The earliest sections are the lower part of the tower and the north aisle (12th century). In the 13th century the chancel was seemingly rebuilt and a south aisle added to the nave. The tower was nearly rebuilt about this time. The 12th-century north aisle and transept were probably pulled down in the 15th century and the existing aisle substituted. The church has rare features including a canonical sundial and a relief of St George.

In 1830 the manor-house (West Park House) was attacked in a riot against the introduction of machinery (Swing riots) and several people were captured and sent to Winchester. One quarter of the village burned down in the "Great Fire" of 1863, but the damage was soon repaired owing to the exertions of the vicar, William Owen.

Damerham was transferred from Wiltshire to Hampshire in 1895. In 1953, the village gave its name to a Ham class minesweeper, HMS Damerham.
