= Uerdingen Hoard =

Ancient Roman hoard

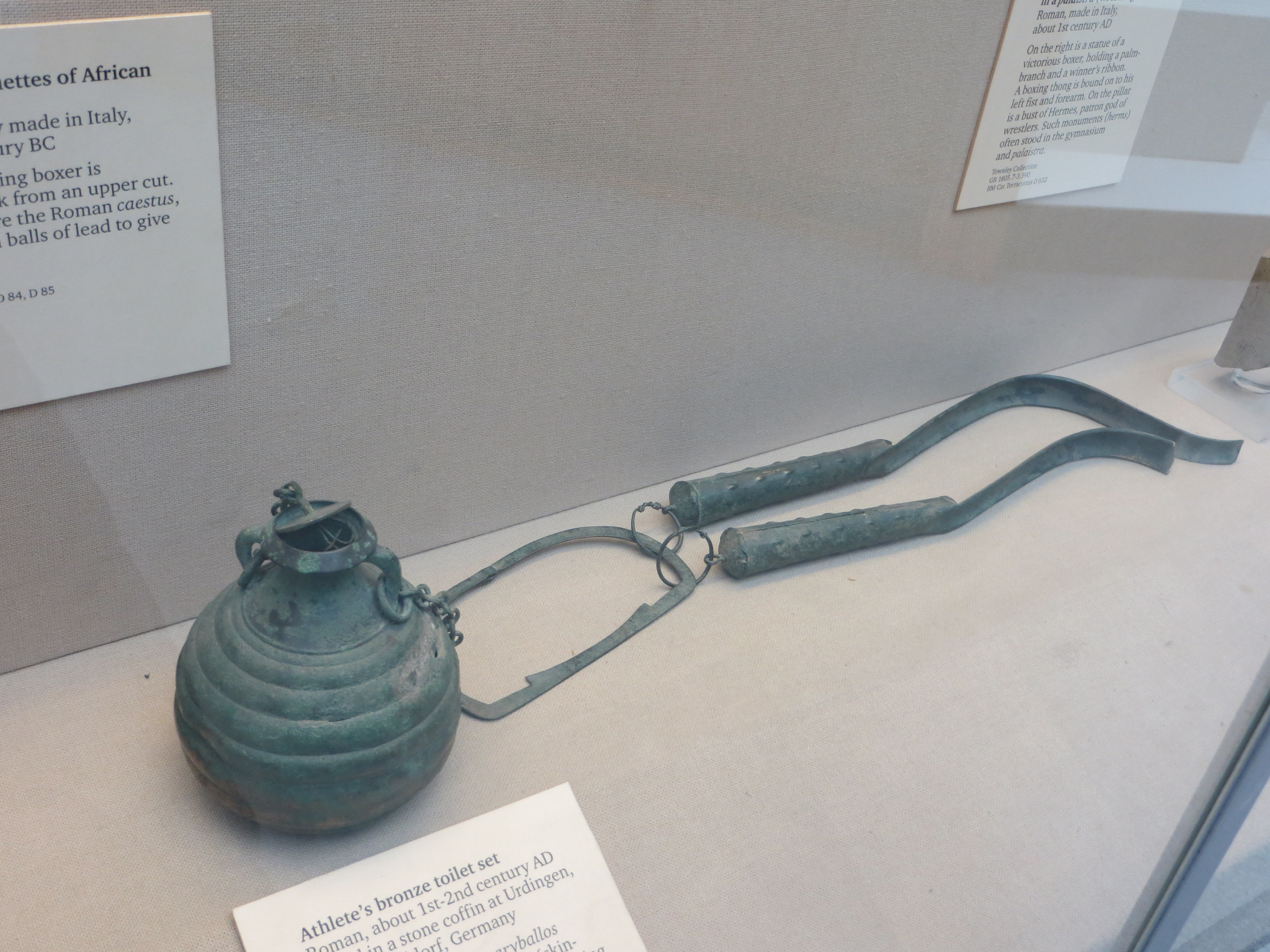
- Athlete's toilet set from the Uerdingen Hoard as displayed in the British Museum
- Material: Bronze and glass
- Created: 2nd–3rd century AD
- Discovered: Uerdingen, Germany
- Present location: British Museum, London
- Registration: 1868,0105.46

The Uerdingen Hoard or Uerdingen Treasure is the name of an historically significant group of ancient objects found in a Roman grave in the town of Uerdingen, western Germany. Discovered in the middle of the 19th century, the entire hoard was donated to the British Museum in 1868.

== Discovery ==
The six grave objects, which date to between the late 2nd and early 3rd centuries AD, were found in a stone coffin at Uerdingen part of the city of Krefeld in North Rhine-Westphalia. The hoard later passed into the possession of the physician and collector Dr George Witt, who presented it to the British Museum in 1868 along with other parts of his collection.

== Description ==
The type of objects found in the grave suggest that the deceased was probably male and from the upper echelons of Roman society. He seemed to be able to afford to be buried with fashionable and in some cases luxurious items. The most important part of the hoard is a well-preserved athlete's bronze toilet set for scraping and cleaning the skin, which consists of an aryballos and two strigils linked together by chains and a hoop for hanging on the wall. There were also a glass handled patera and oinochoe decorated with polychrome serpentine designs, which would have been used for hand-washing between meals. Other items from the tomb include a cylindrical bronze pot and lid, a bronze razor and a small glass vessel coloured green.

== See also ==
- Apoxyomenos

== Gallery ==
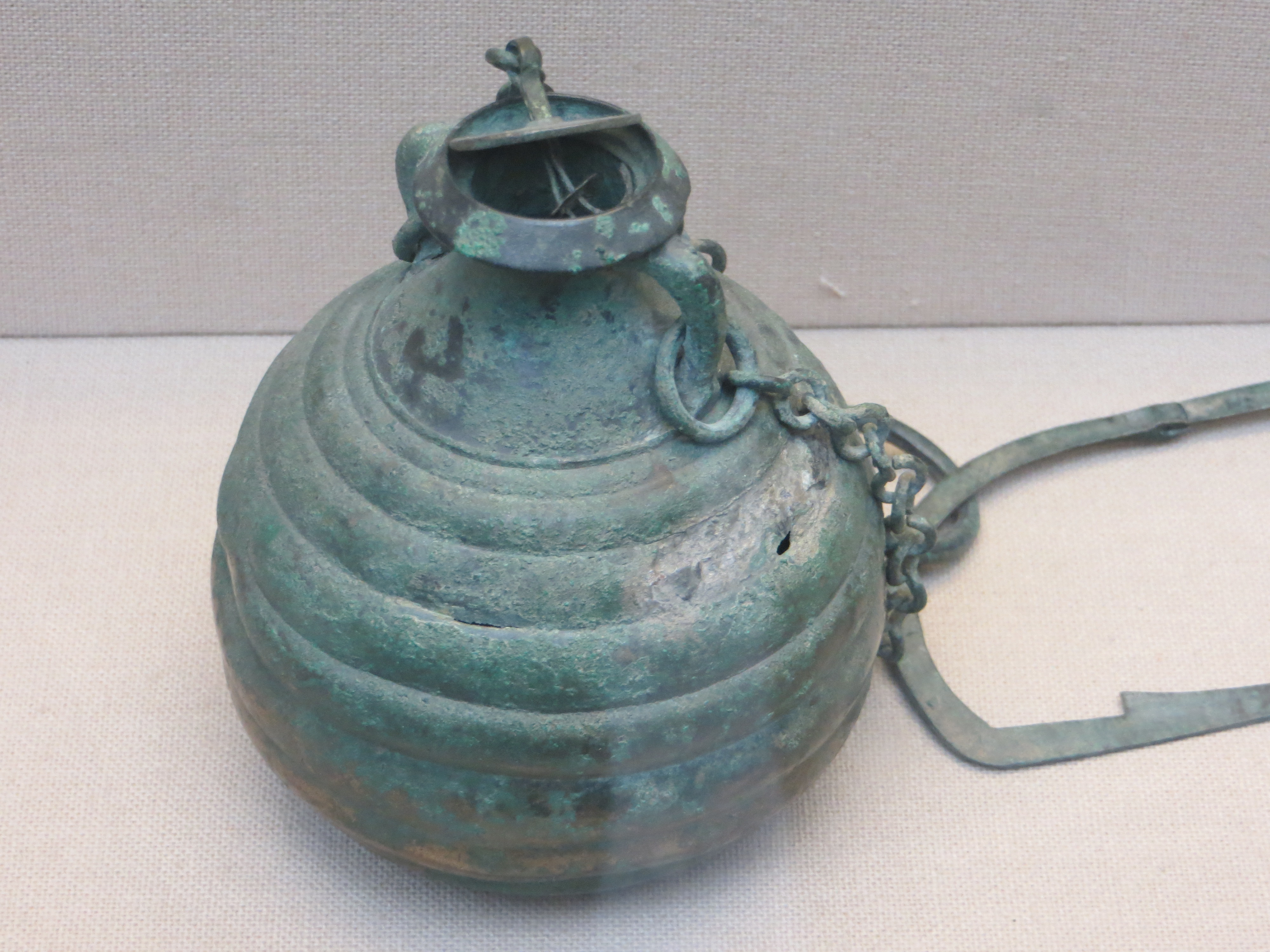
Bronze aryballos for dispensing perfumes

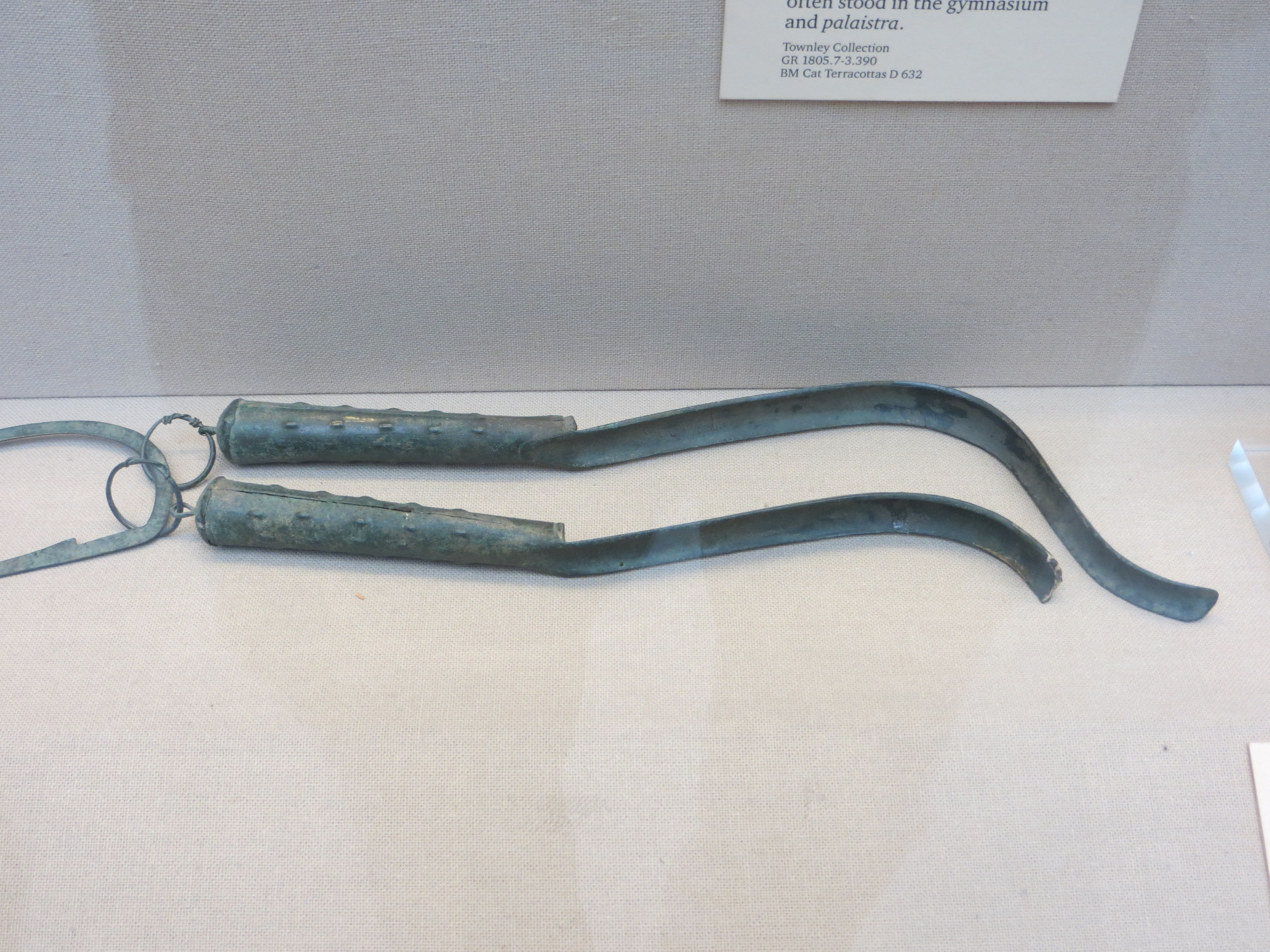
Pair of bronze strigils used for scraping skin

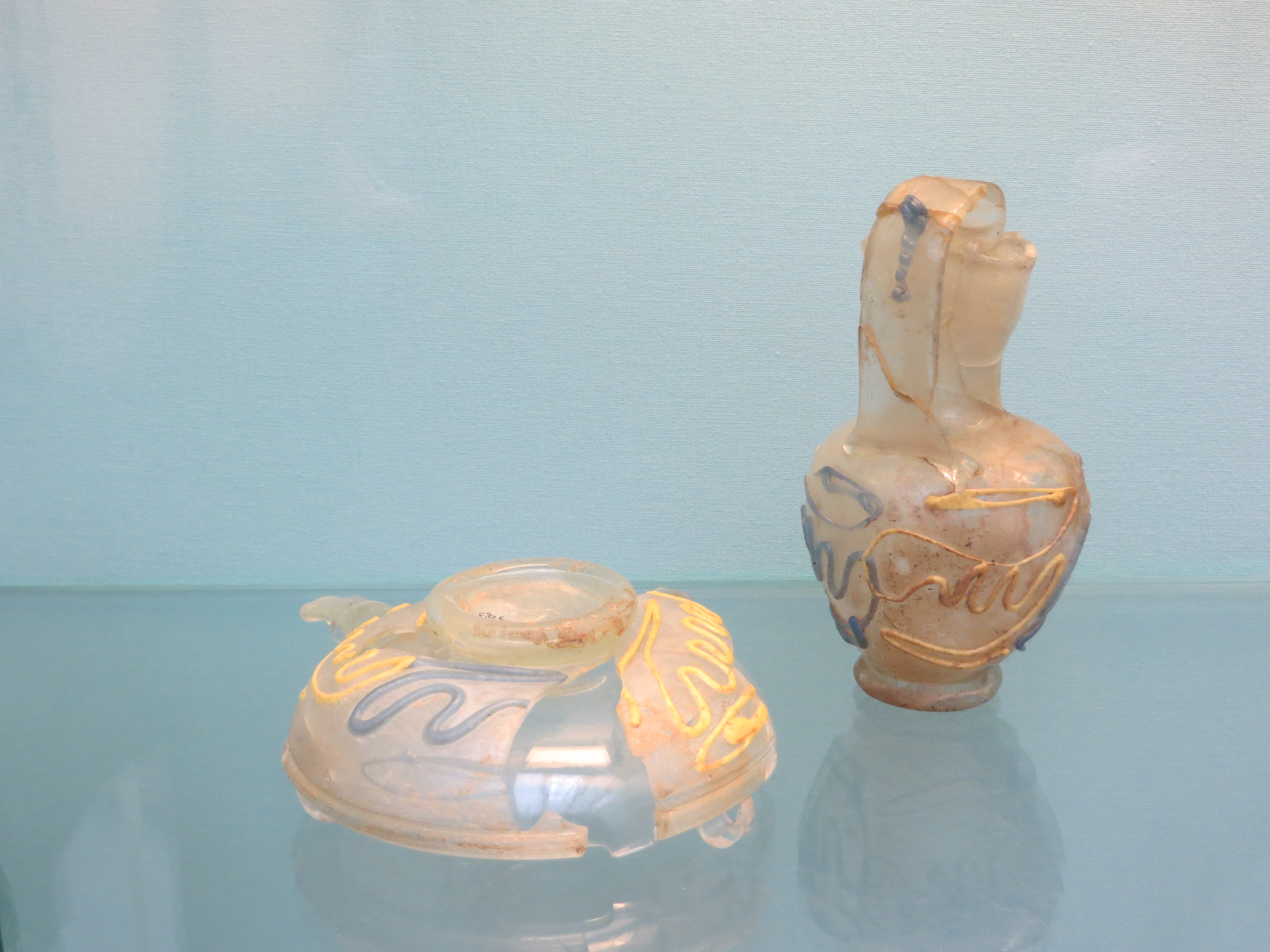
Two glass vessels with snake-like patterns

== Bibliography ==
- L. Burn, The British Museum Book of Greek and Roman Art (British Museum Press, 1991)
- S. Walker, Roman Art (British Museum Press, 1991)
- R. Pirling, Ein römischer Grabfund aus Lank-Latum im British Museum, London, in: Heimat [Krefeld], 56, 1985
