= George Witt (collector) =

English collector of erotic objects (1804–1869)

George Witt FRS
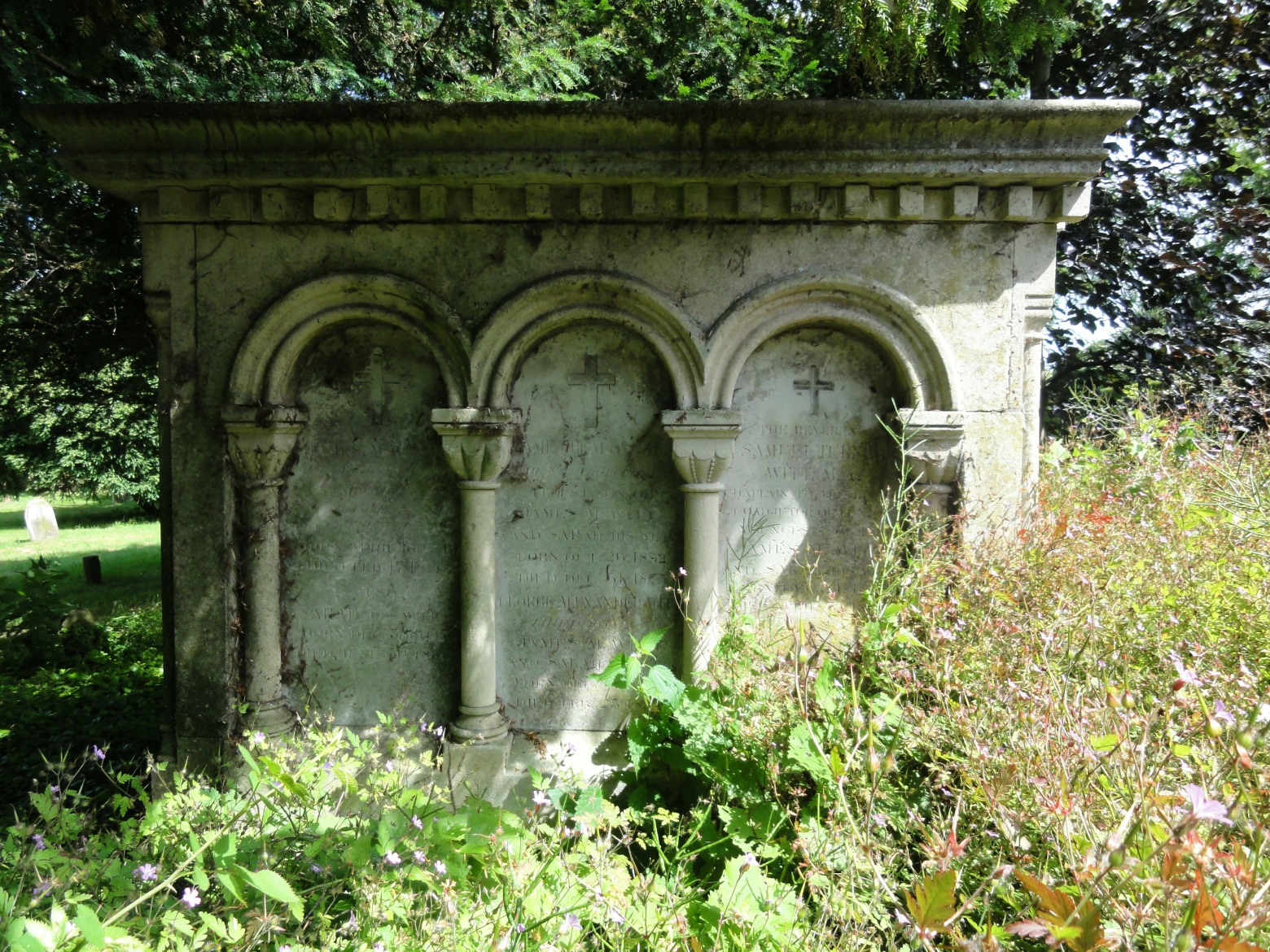
- The Witt family tomb at Swaffham Prior
- Born: 25 March 1804; Swaffham Prior, Cambridgeshire, England
- Died: 20 February 1869 (aged 64); London, England
- Education: Leiden University
- Spouse: Elizabeth Hedley

George Witt FRS (25 March 1804 – 20 February 1869) was a medical doctor, banker and mayor known for his collection of erotic objects.

== Biography ==
George Witt was born at Swaffham Prior, Cambridgeshire, the fifth son of Matthew Witt, a farmer, and Sarah (née Woollard). He was baptised on 23 May 1805, at the Anglican St. Mary's Church, Swaffham Prior.

Witt studied to become a physician at Northampton General Infirmary before he worked briefly for the East India Company. He notably took charge of a cholera epidemic on board a ship at Calcutta. He became a surgeon at Bedford Infirmary from where he visited Leiden for just three months. Based on his work in Calcutta he graduated as a Doctor of Medicine at the University. Witt married Elizabeth Hedley in Bedford in 1832. He practised as a doctor in Bedford where he rose to be the medical lead at Bedford Infirmary and by 1834 he was elected to the Mayor of Bedford. Witt was also elected to be a Fellow of the Royal Society the same year. Witt however failed to become an Alderman in Bedford until 1845 as his first application was turned down as he was not thought to have been a first class mayor a decade before.

In 1849 he was made "physician extraordinary" after he resigned from the Infirmary citing personal reasons. Witt had been recognised for the contribution of anatomical specimens and his collection of antiquities and natural history artefacts was particularly valued and it was thought that the town could establish a museum based on Witt's collection. Part of this collection was sold and eventually became part of first Bedford Modern School and eventually Bedford Museum.

== Australia and London ==
Donations to the British Museum from George Witt

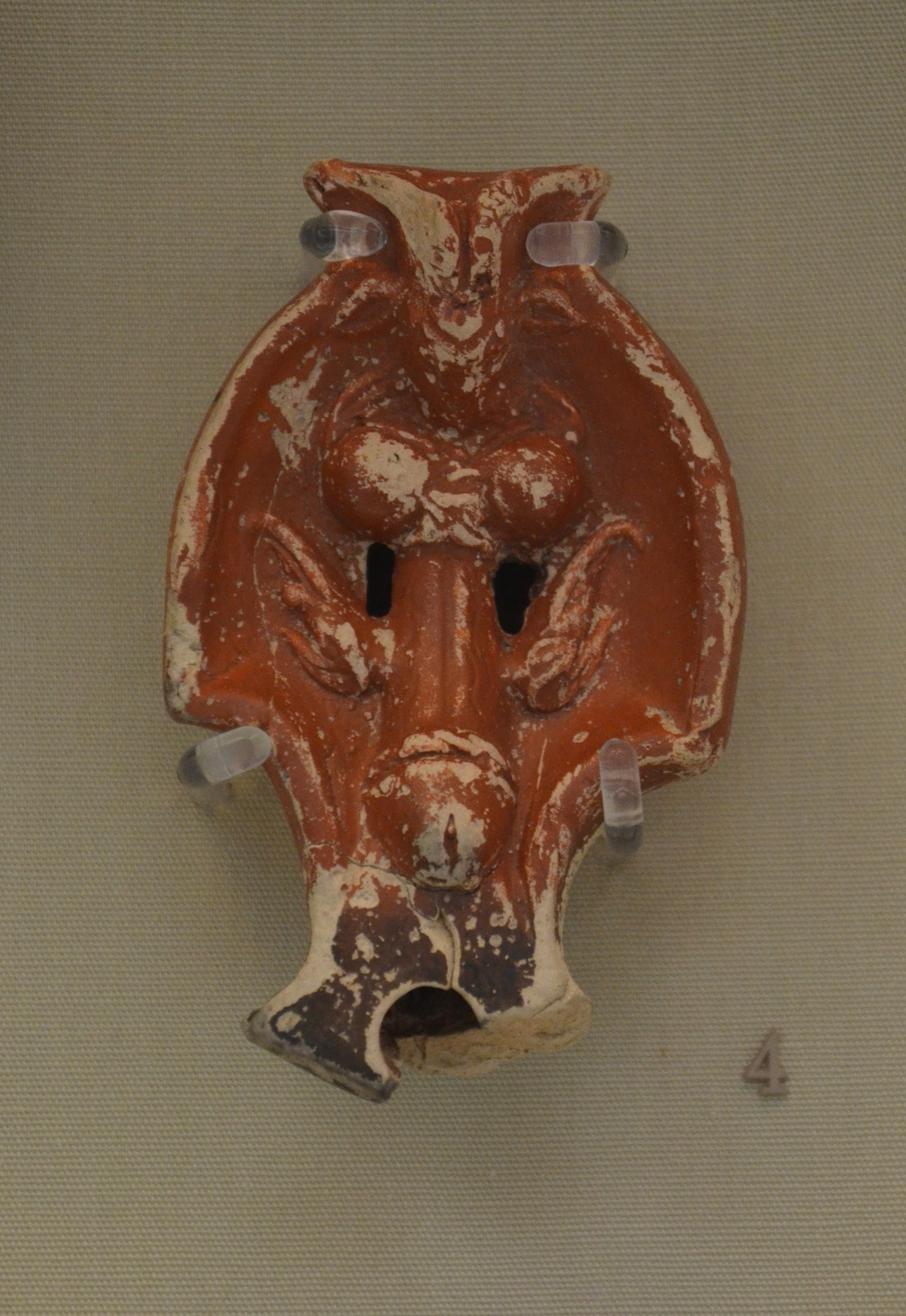
Terracotta lamp from central Italy, decorated with a winged phallus

Witt emigrated to Australia and settled in Sydney in 1850 where he resumed his medical career. Within a short time however he was distracted to banking and speculation and at this occupation he made a fortune as a banker. Witt returned to the United Kingdom where he used his money to establish a new house near Hyde Park. Witt now began to put together a collection of what would have been considered obscene objects. Witt was not concerned with the detailed provenance of these objects and he collected both ancient and modern items. Witt shared these objects with an international group of correspondents who appreciated these artefacts. Some of the items concerned nothing more unusual than body cleaning including the Uerdingen Hoard.

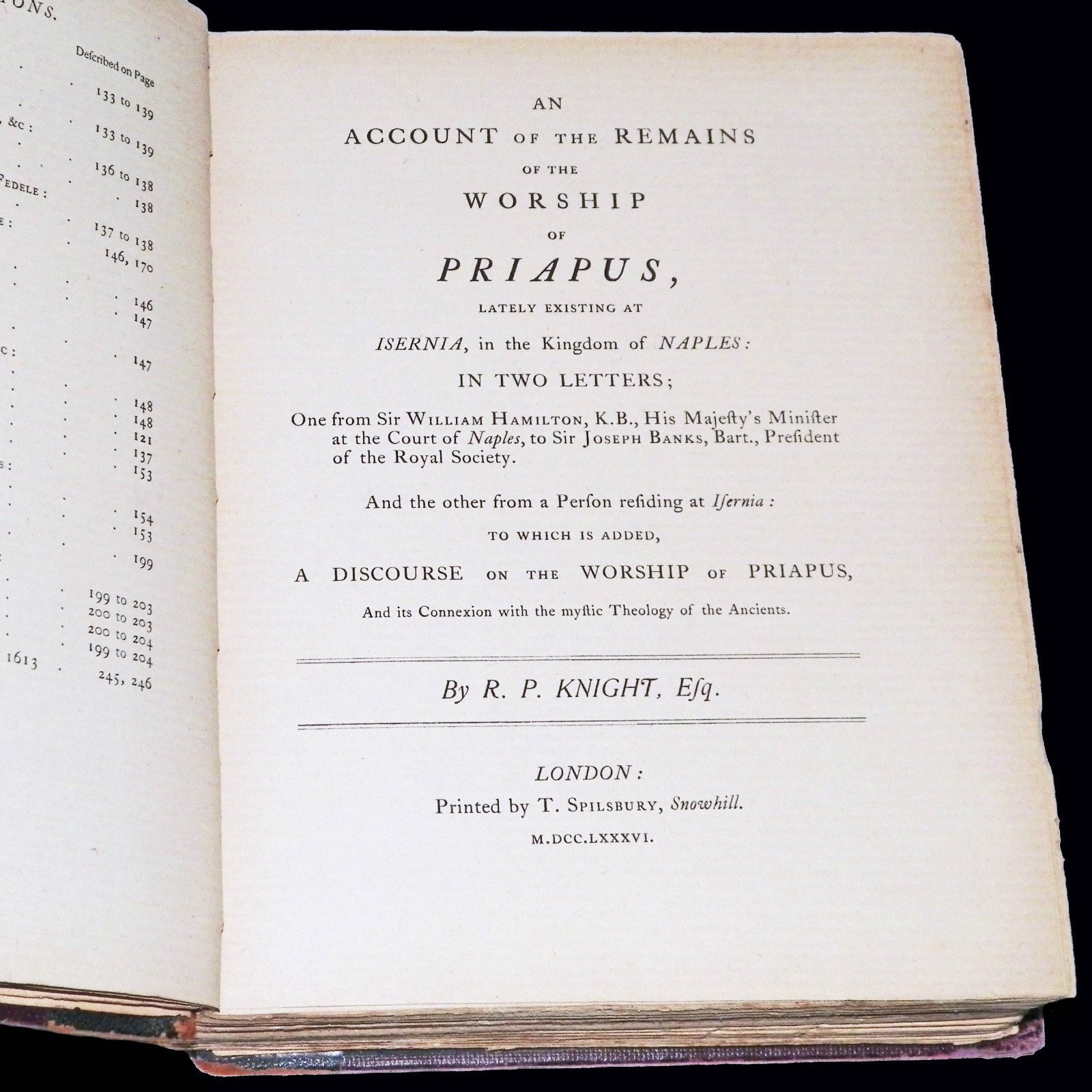
Frontispiece of Discourse on the worship of Priapus and its connection with the mystic theology of the ancients by Richard Payne Knight as republished by Witt in 1865

In the 1860s there was a lot of interest in the theories concerning the worship of Priapus and Witt organised for Richard Payne Knight's Discourse on the worship of Priapus and its connection with the mystic theology of the ancients to be republished with additional material and illustrations in 1865. Following an illness the same year, Witt approached the British Museum to enquire whether they would take his collection. The museum's director Anthony Panizzi agreed to take the objects even though they became a major part of a secret collection known as the museum's Secretum. Panizzi did not think twice as he considered the collection to be of the right quality for his museum. The collection appeared to be chosen primarily on the basis of its obscenity. The collection included modern photographs of women partially dressed as gladiators which were not thought to be academic artefacts but they were designed to be erotic. One of the artefacts was a toothed chastity belt which was thought to be medieval but was in fact a contemporary invention. In general however Witt's collection covered the major civilisations of Greece, Rome, Egyptian, Indian, Chinese, Tibetan, Japanese and Native American. Besides votive objects, bronzes and pottery his collection also included watercolours and sketches. Of particular note were his library and the records of his correspondence which included the details of objects not in the collection including a catalogue of the secret cabinet of Naples Museum. Following the acceptance of his collection by the British Museum in 1865, Witt published "Catalogue of a Collection Illustrative of Phallic Worship" in 1866 to commemorate the approval of his artefacts by Panizzi.

== Promotion of the Victorian Turkish bath ==
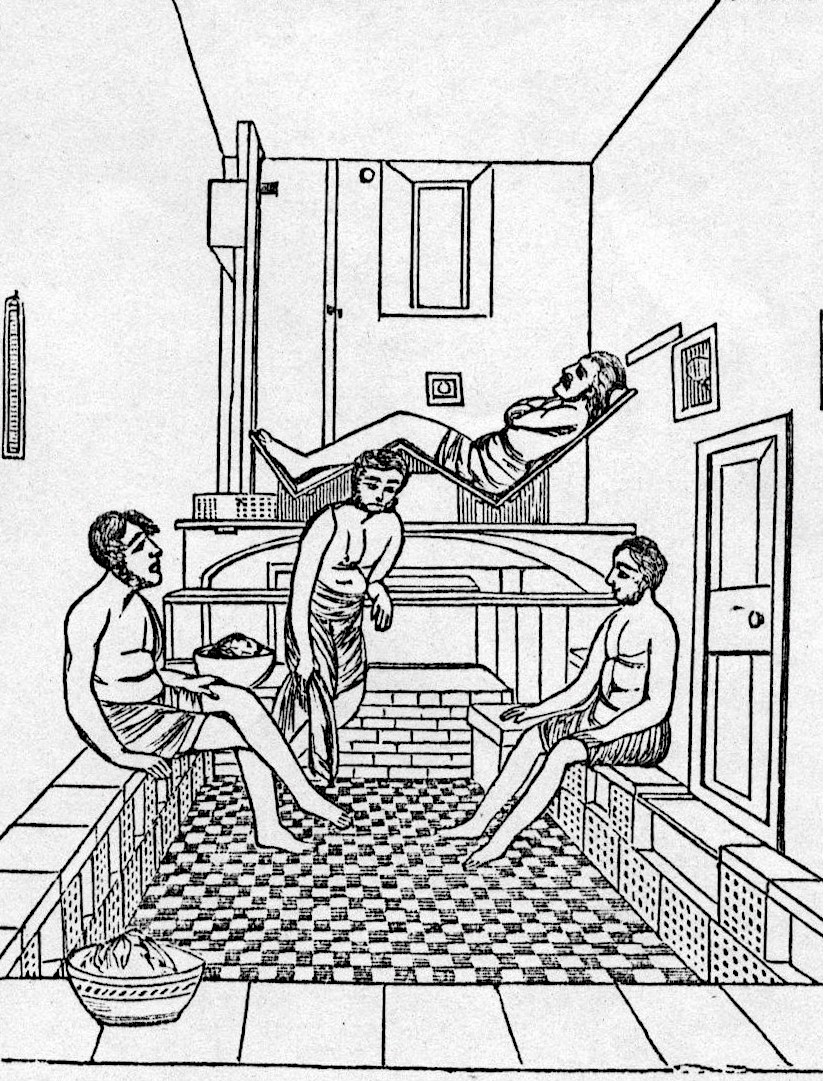
George Witt's Turkish bath

In the late 1850s, Witt was much influenced by his long-standing friend, David Urquhart, who in 1857 had just opened England's first Victorian Turkish bath in Manchester. Urquhart argued that, just as he had made his own bath available to his friends, others should follow suit in order to spread knowledge about the bath and encourage the building of such baths for the public. Witt was one of the first who acted upon this suggestion, converting a room in his Knightsbridge home into an effective Turkish bath as early as 1858. Although it was only a single room, bathing in the hot air at different temperatures was achieved by arranging seating at different levels. Witt became a strong advocate of the Turkish bath and was responsible for introducing many friends, especially medical practitioners, to its therapeutic possibilities. Among his guests were dermatologist Erasmus Wilson (who went on to write a book on the bath), Thomas Spenser Wells, Queen Victoria's surgeon and president of the Royal College of Surgeons, Charles Lockhart Robertson (who successfully introduced the bath into the Sussex and District Lunatic Asylum at Haywards Heath), and William Joseph Goodwin, Queen Victoria's personal vet (who installed a Turkish bath for the Queen's horses at Hampton Court Palace Mews).

== Legacy ==
Witt died on 20 February 1869, at his home, 20 Princes' Terrace, Hyde Park, London. He was buried at Swaffham Prior. His wife, Elizabeth (née Hedley), died at the same house in 1871 and was also buried at Swaffham Prior.

Witt's collection remained together in the Secretum until the Second World War. In 1939 the first set of artefacts were removed from the collection, which was based on taste, and each item was classified according to its provenance. An interesting anecdote arose when an enquiry was received at the museum to view the remaining items. The request was challenged by the curators. They wanted to know why the researcher was making an application to view the collection's index. The museum also not only wanted to know what the list would be used for but what arrangements would be made to dispose of the list after the researcher's death.

As of 2014 the "secret" collection contained half of Witt's legacy which has not been reclassified. The curators of the museum think that these remaining items, and another 100 items from other sources, will be kept as a single collection as these items record Victorian values and the changing attitude to obscenity.
