= HMS St Brides Bay =

1945 Bay-class anti-aircraft frigate of the Royal Navy

History

United Kingdom
- Name: HMS St Brides Bay
- Namesake: St Brides Bay
- Ordered: 2 May 1943
- Builder: Harland & Wolff, Belfast
- Yard number: 1250
- Laid down: 2 May 1944
- Launched: 16 January 1945
- Completed: 15 June 1945
- Commissioned: June 1945
- Decommissioned: 16 December 1961
- Identification: Pennant number K600/F600
- Honours and awards: Korea 1950–53
- Fate: Sold for scrapping, 1962
- Badge: On a Field White, on a lozenge Blue, surrounded by flames proper, a celestial crown Gold.

General characteristics
- Class & type: Bay-class frigate
- Displacement: 1,600 long tons (1,626 t) standard; 2,530 long tons (2,571 t) full
- Length: 286 ft (87 m) p/p; 307 ft 3 in (93.65 m) o/a
- Beam: 38 ft 6 in (11.73 m)
- Draught: 12 ft 9 in (3.89 m)
- Propulsion: 2 × Admiralty 3-drum boilers, 2 shafts, 4-cylinder vertical triple expansion reciprocating engines, 5,500 ihp (4,100 kW)
- Speed: 19.5 knots (36.1 km/h; 22.4 mph)
- Range: 724 tons oil fuel, 9,500 nmi (17,600 km) at 12 knots (22 km/h)
- Complement: 157
- Sensors & processing systems: Type 285 fire control radar; Type 291 air warning radar; Type 276 target indication radar; High Frequency Direction Finder (HF/DF); IFF transponder
- Armament: 4 × QF 4 inch Mark XVI guns on 2 twin mounting HA/LA Mk.XIX; 4 × 40 mm Bofors A/A on 2 twin mounts Mk.V; 4 × 20 mm Oerlikon A/A on 2 twin mounts Mk.V; 1 × Hedgehog 24 barrel A/S projector; 2 rails and 4 throwers for 50 depth charges

HMS St Brides Bay was a Bay-class anti-aircraft frigate of the British Royal Navy, named for St Brides Bay in Pembrokeshire. In commission from 1945 to 1961, she served in the Mediterranean and Eastern Fleets, seeing active service in the Korean War.

== Construction ==
The ship was originally ordered from Harland and Wolff, Belfast, on 2 May 1943 as the Loch-class frigate Loch Achilty, and was laid down on 2 May 1944. However the contract was then changed, and the ship was completed to a revised design as a Bay-class anti-aircraft frigate. Admiralty Job No. J3902 was launched as St Brides Bay on 16 January 1945, and completed on 15 June 1945 by Miss Patricia M Rebbeck.

== Service history ==
=== Mediterranean Fleet ===
After sea trials St Brides Bay was commissioned for service in the British Pacific Fleet in June 1945. In July she sailed for Malta, but the proposed deployment in the Pacific was cancelled in August and she was reallocated to the 5th Escort Flotilla in the Mediterranean Fleet. There her duties included weather ship and air sea rescue duties in the western Atlantic during U.S. aircraft troop repatriation flights in late November 1945, patrol duty in the Aegean, Adriatic, and Red Seas, and periods as Guardship at Alexandria, Trieste, and Aqaba, as well as attachment to the Haifa Patrol, attempting to intercept ships carrying illegal Jewish immigrants to Palestine. In May 1948 her pennant number was changed from K600 to F600.

In July 1949 she sailed with sister ship Cardigan Bay to join the Eastern Fleet, arriving at Hong Kong on 31 August, and joining the 4th Frigate Flotilla. Her duties at Hong Kong included Guardship duty in the Yangtze, surveillance of Chinese Nationalist warship movements, and patrols to support military operations against insurgent forces in Malaya.

=== Korean War ===
In December 1950 St Brides Bay was sent to join the British naval forces that formed part of the United Nations Naval Task Force after the outbreak of the Korean War. She was deployed off the west coast of Korea and supported the evacuation of Incheon. From February to July 1951 St Brides Bay was deployed for Flotilla duties at Hong Kong and Singapore, returning to Korea in August for patrols and fire support duties off the west coast. In December she took part in bombardment operations on the Han River, returning to Hong Kong in January 1952 to continue supporting operations in Malaya. Her third UN tour began in June, and in July she was detached for duty with the United States Task Group on the East Coast, providing medical aid to the destroyer USS John R. Pierce after she was damaged by 75 mm shore battery fire off Songjin. She returned to Hong Kong for flotilla duties in November, and in April 1953 began her fourth Korean tour, deployed for military support off the east coast. In June she carried out bombardments in Ch'o-do area in support of RoK Army operations before being released from United Nations duty.

=== Eastern Fleet ===
After a refit at Hong Kong St Brides Bay resumed her usual duties; local and fleet exercises, patrols in the Formosa Straits, and further patrols off Korea, serving as Guardship at Pangyaengo Do off the east coast. Frequent exercises were carried out with ships of the United States, Australian and New Zealand navies.

On 16 August 1953, she intervened when the British mercantile freighter Nigelock (the former Flower-class corvette Nigella), was seized in the Taiwan Strait by a gunboat of the Republic of China Navy enforcing Taiwan's Guanbi policy of blockading the coast of mainland China and ordered to make for Penghu. The appearance of St Brides Bay caused the gunboat to depart, allowing the freighter to continue on her original journey.

During the Suez Crisis in late 1956 St Brides Bay was sent to Aden for patrols in the Red Sea, returning to Singapore in January 1957. In February she detached for service in New Zealand, arriving at Auckland in March for exercises, training and patrols, returning to Hong Kong in July. The ship was refitted at HM Dockyard, Singapore, from December 1957 to March 1958, and in April sailed to Inchon with the frigate Alert for an official visit by the Commander-in-Chief, Far East. In August she returned to Aden for local patrols and interception of illegal traffic, returning to Singapore in October.

In January 1959 she was deployed for Borneo patrol, and in March escorted the Royal Yacht Britannia to Hong Kong. After a refit, and local exercises she was deployed to Addu Atoll as Guardship in September, returning to Singapore in December.

In early 1960 St Brides Bay was detached for visits to Australia and New Zealand, calling at Fremantle and Adelaide, Auckland and Wellington, Hobart, Sydney and Cairns, before returning to Singapore in March. In May, while at Hong Kong some of ship's company were employed as extras during the filming of The World of Suzie Wong. In June she took part in Fleet exercises and made an official visit to Japan, calling at Yokohama and Maizuru. On arrival back at Hong Kong on 2 July she collided with the minesweeper Damerham, almost cutting the ship in half. In November she and Cardigan Bay sailed to Townsville, Queensland, for detached service on a Pacific islands visit programme, calling at Nouméa, New Caledonia, Suva, Fiji and Apia, Samoa. She arrived at Pearl Harbor on 9 January 1961, then called at Funafuti, Onotoa and Tarawa in the Gilbert and Ellice Islands, Manus, Admiralty Islands, and Iloilo, Philippines, before returning to Hong Kong in March.

In May she was deployed for anti-piracy patrol duties based at Tawau, Borneo, calling at Yokosuka in June. After exercises with the Far East Fleet and Commonwealth warships she sailed for Australia in late August, calling at Brisbane, Mackay, Cairns and Darwin, before returning to Singapore in September.

In November 1961 St Brides Bay sailed for the UK, arriving at Portsmouth on 14 December. Two days later the ship was decommissioned after 16 years of continuous overseas service. Put into Reserve at Portsmouth in January 1962, she was sold to BISCO for scrapping. She was towed to Faslane for breaking-up by Metal Industries, arriving there on 3 September 1962.

== Publications ==
- Colledge, J. J.; Warlow, Ben (2006) [1969]. Ships of the Royal Navy: The Complete Record of All Fighting Ships of the Royal Navy from the 15th Century to the Present (3rd Rev ed.). London: Chatham Publishing. ISBN 978-1-86176-281-8. OCLC 67375475.
