= David Gaimster =

British museum director and archaeologist

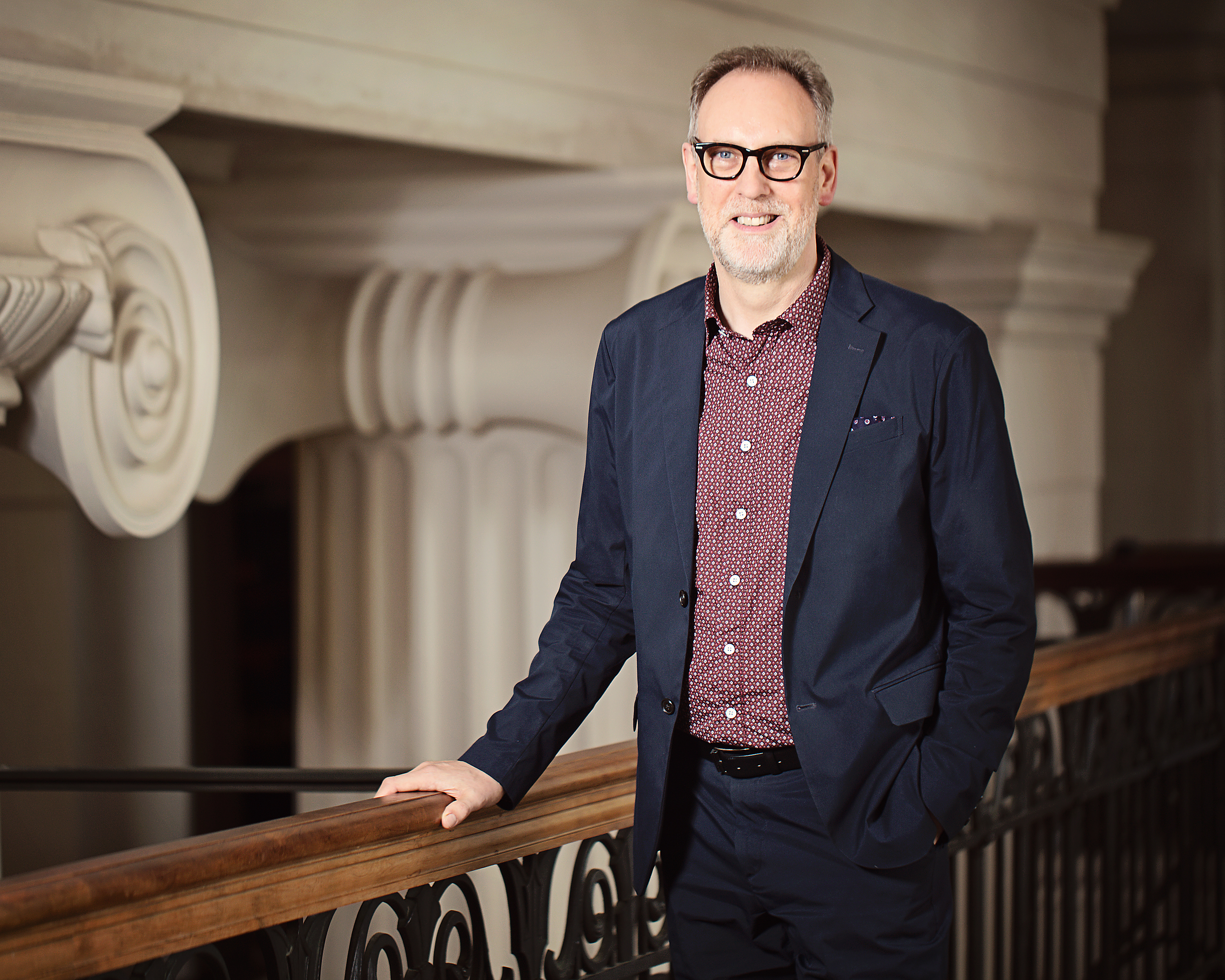
- Gaimster at the Auckland War Memorial Museum in 2019
- Born: Cambridge, England, United kingdom
- Education: Durham University (BA); University College London (PhD)
- Occupations: Museum executive, archaeologist

David Richard Michael Gaimster is a British archaeologist and museum executive. During the 1990s, Gaimster published extensively on medieval to early modern European archaeology, notably on ceramics and Hanseatic material culture, including the 1997 book German Stoneware, 1200–1900: Archaeology and Cultural History. Gaimster became the director of the Hunterian at the University of Glasgow from 2010 to 2017, after which he moved to New Zealand, becoming the director of the Auckland War Memorial Museum from 2017 to 2023. Gaimster was the director of the South Australian Museum in Adelaide, South Australia, in 2023 to 2024.

== Early life and education ==
David Gaimster was born and raised in Cambridge, England, where he developed an interest in archaeology as a young child.

In 1984 he graduated from Durham University with a BA.

In 1991 he earned a PhD from University College London, with his thesis entitled "Pottery Supply and Demand in the Lower Rhineland c. 1400–1800: an Archaeological Study of Ceramic Production, Distribution and Use in the City of Duisburg and Its Hinterland".

== Career ==
Gaimster began working for the British Museum in 1985, working as a field archaeologist, an assistant keeper in the Medieval & Later Antiquities department and briefly as the caretaker of the Secretum. In 1991 while working at the museum, Gaimster received a PhD from University College London.

During the 1990s and early 2000s, Gaimster published works relating to medieval and early modern European archaeology, notably on ceramics and Hanseatic material culture. In 1997, Gaimster published German Stoneware, 1200–1900: Archaeology and Cultural History, one of the most significant works on European ceramics published in the 20th Century. From 2002 to 2004, Gaimster worked as a senior policy advisor for the Department for Culture, Media and Sport, when he worked on measures to prevent trafficking of cultural objects through market reduction approach laws. From 2004 to 2010, Gaimster worked as the General Secretary and Chief Executive for the Society of Antiquaries of London, and in September 2010 became the director of the Hunterian Museum in Glasgow.

Gaimster moved with his family to Auckland, New Zealand in 2017, where he became the director of the Auckland War Memorial Museum. During his time at the museum, he oversaw the construction of Te Ao Mārama, a redevelopment of the south atrium space, and managed the museum during the COVID-19 pandemic.

In June 2023, Gaimster moved to Adelaide to take up the position of the director of the South Australian Museum, but stepped down from that role at the end of 2024. In June 2025, Gaimster returned to London to take up the position of the director of Strawberry Hill House.

== Recognition and honours ==
- 1996: Elected Fellow of the Society of Antiquaries of London
- 2005: SHA Award of Merit by the Society for Historical Archaeology, for his work in historical archaeology
- 2016: Elected Fellow of the Royal Society of Edinburgh
- 2019: Appointed honorary adjunct professor at the University of Auckland, in Museum and Cultural Heritage

== Selected publications ==
=== Books ===
- Gaimster, David; Redknap, Mark; Wegner, Hans-Helmut, eds. (1988). Zur Keramik des Mittelalters und der beginnenden Neuzeit im Rheinland, Medieval and later pottery from the Rhineland and its markets. BAR International Series (in English and German). ISBN 0-86054-567-9. Wikidata Q104384554.
- Gaimster, David; Redknap, Mark, eds. (1992). Everyday and Exotic Pottery from Europe c. 650–1900. Studies in Honour of John Hurst. Oxford: Oxbow Books. ISBN 0-946897-47-6. OL 1134189M. Wikidata Q77220811.
- Gaimster, David (1997). German Stoneware, 1200–1900: Archaeology and Cultural History. London: British Museum Press. ISBN 978-0-7141-0571-0. OCLC 39615431. Wikidata Q118935190.
- Gaimster, David; Stamper, Paul, eds. (1997). The Age of Transition: The Archaeology of English Culture, 1400-1600. Society for Medieval Archaeology Monograph Series. Oxbow Books. ISBN 978-1-900188-55-5. Wikidata Q64214989.
- Gaimster, David (1999). Maiolica in the North: The Archaeology of Tin-Glazed Earthenware in North-West Europe, c. 1500–1600. London: British Museum. ISBN 0-86159-122-4. OCLC 42137914. OL 11665002M. Wikidata Q118937502.
- Gaimster, David; Gilchrist, Roberta, eds. (2003), The Archaeology of Reformation, 1480–1580, Leeds: Maney Publishing, Wikidata Q63967875
- Gaimster, David; McCarthy, Sarah; Nurse, Bernard (2007). Making History: Antiquaries in Britain 1707–2007. London: Royal Academy of Arts. ISBN 978-1-905711-03-1. OCLC 749943097. Wikidata Q118938730.
- Majewski, Teresita; Gaimster, David, eds. (2009), International Handbook of Historical Archaeology (PDF), New York City: Springer Publishing, OCLC 432709371, OL 19810567W, Wikidata Q99843293
- Gaimster, David (2012), The Hunterian, University of Glasgow: Director's Choice, London: Scala Arts & Heritage Publishers, Wikidata Q118938420
- Gaimster, David (21 February 2019). Director's Choice: Auckland Museum. London: Scala Arts & Heritage Publishers. ISBN 978-1-78551-173-8. OCLC 1029847641. Wikidata Q115691905.

=== Chapters ===
- David Gaimster (1994). "The archaeology of post-medieval society, c 1450–1750: material culture studies in Britain since the war". Building on the Past: Papers Celebrating 150 Years of the Royal Archaeological Institute: 283–312. Wikidata Q118943639.

=== Articles ===
- Gaimster, David; Cowell, Mike (January 1988). "Post-Medieval Ceramic Stove-tiles bearing the Royal Arms: Evidence for their Manufacture and Use in southern Britain". The Archaeological Journal. 145 (1): 314–343. doi:10.1080/00665983.1988.11077854. ISSN 0066-5983. Wikidata Q54331606.
- Gaimster, David; Boland, Peter; Linnane, Steve; Cartwright, Caroline (January 1996). "The archaeology of private life: the Dudley Castle condoms". Post-Medieval Archaeology. 30 (1): 129–142. doi:10.1179/PMA.1996.003. ISSN 0079-4236. Wikidata Q56119600.
- Gaimster, David (1999). "The Baltic ceramic market, c1200–1600: an archaeology of the Hansa". Fennoscandia Archaeologica. 16: 59–69. ISSN 0781-7126. Wikidata Q104917169.
- Gaimster, David (September 2005). "A parallel history: the archaeology of Hanseatic urban culture in the Baltic c.1200–1600". World Archaeology. 37 (3): 408–423. doi:10.1080/00438240500168483. ISSN 0043-8243. Wikidata Q57753002.
- Gaimster, David (2014). "The Hanseatic Cultural Signature: Exploring Globalization on the Micro-Scale in Late Medieval Northern Europe". European Journal of Archaeology. 17 (1): 60–81. doi:10.1179/1461957113Y.0000000044. ISSN 1461-9571. Wikidata Q77313232.
