= Kelly Olson =

Canadian professor and classicist

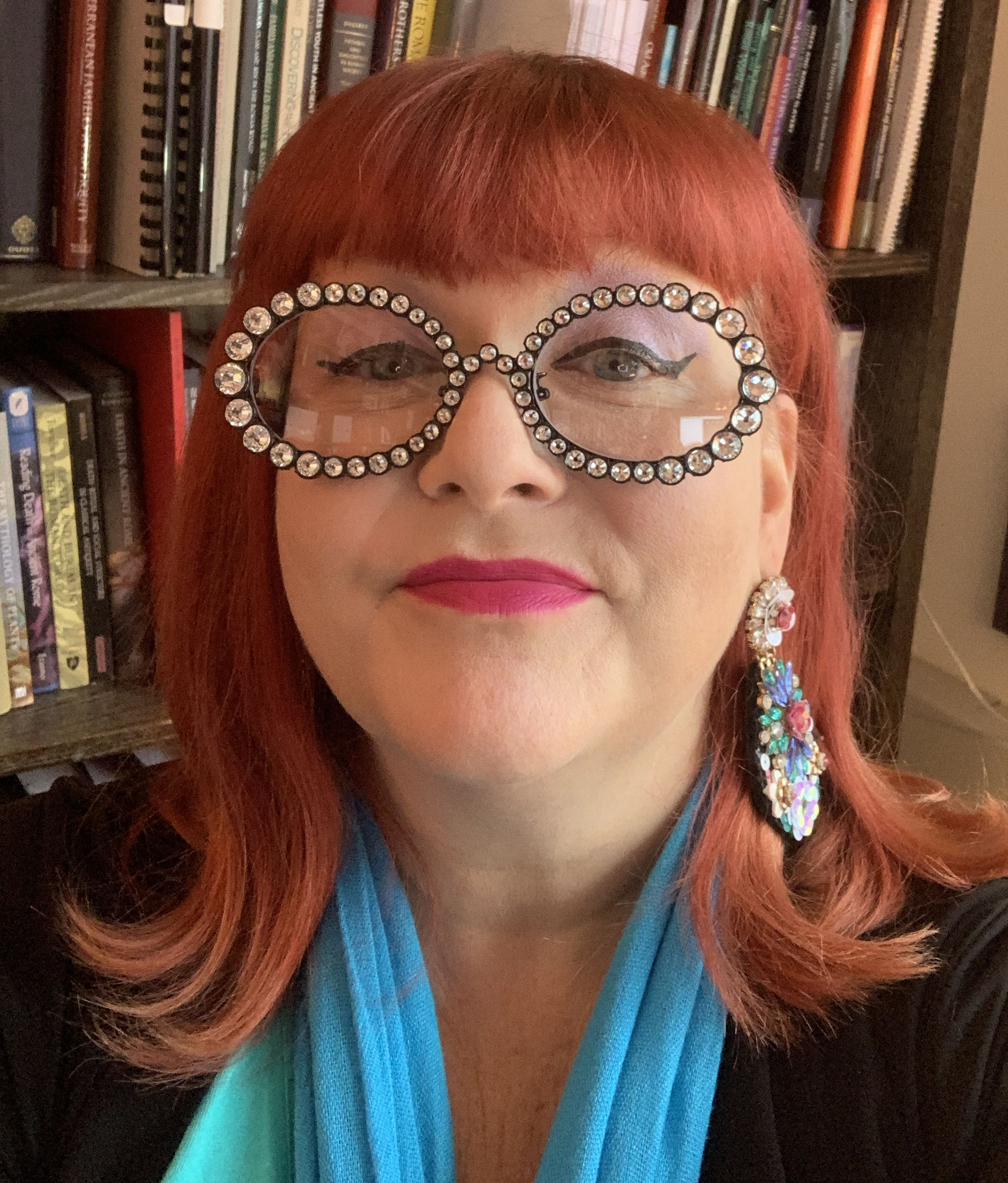

Academic background
- Education: University of Chicago; University of Victoria; University of Calgary
- Doctoral advisor: Richard Saller

Academic work
- Discipline: Classics
- Sub-discipline: Roman antiquity; dress studies
- Institutions: University of Western Ontario
- Website: kellyolsonblog.wordpress.com

Kelly Olson is a Canadian Classicist. She is Professor in the Department of Classical Studies at the University of Western Ontario.

Olson earned her PhD from University of Chicago in 1999. Her thesis was entitled Fashioning the Female in Roman Antiquity. She received a MA from University of Chicago in 1997 and from University of Victoria in 1992, and her BA (with Honours) from University of Calgary in 1990.

Olson has published extensively on clothing and appearance (including cosmetics, jewelry, and hairstyles) in Roman antiquity. Her scholarship has been described as the "standard resource" in ancient dress studies.

Olson has been awarded several Social Sciences and Humanities Research Council grants, including an Insight Development grant (2019–21) for her project, "Roman Jewelry and the Technology of Enchantment," and a Standard Research grant (2008-2011) for her project, "Men, Appearance, and Sexuality in Roman Antiquity".

Olson is a highly visible public intellectual. She has discussed her scholarship in public lectures at the Art Institute of Chicago and the Getty Center, as well as videos and podcasts.

Olson has also served as a historical consultant for the comic book series, Eternus, created by Andy Serkis and Andrew Levitas.

== Select bibliography ==
- Dress and the Roman Woman: Self-Presentation and Society (London and New York: Routledge, 2008).
- Masculinity and Dress in Roman Antiquity (London and New York: Routledge, 2017).
- Dress in Mediterranean Antiquity: Greeks, Romans, Jews, Christians (London: T&T Clark, 2021).
