= Catherine Johns =

British archaeologist and museum curator

Catherine M Johns FSA
- Occupations: Archaeologist; Museum curator

Academic work
- Discipline: Archaeology; Classical Archaeology
- Sub-discipline: Roman Britain; Roman jewellery
- Institutions: British Museum

Catherine Johns FSA (born 1941) is a British archaeologist and museum curator. She is a specialist in Roman jewellery, Romano-British provincial art, and erotic art.

== Career ==
Johns worked for many years, until 2002, as the Curator of Roman Britain at the British Museum. She was elected as a Fellow of the Society of Antiquaries of London in January 1973.

Johns has published numerous articles and books on archaeological subjects including the Snettisham Jeweller's Hoard, the Hoxne Hoard, and the Barber Cup.

From 2003 to 2011 she was appointed by the Department for Culture, Media and Sport as a member of the reviewing committee on the 'Export of Works of Art and Objects of Cultural Interest'. She served three terms as a member of this Reviewing Committee. As part of this body, in 2009, she helped block the export of a unique Viking mount from North Yorkshire valued at over £50,000.

Johns has also served on the committees of the Society of Antiquaries of London, the Roman Society, and the British Archaeological Association. She is a former Chair of the Society of Jewellery Historians and a former trustee of the Roman Research Trust. In 2010 she was elected as a Corresponding Member of the Archaeological Institute of America.

== Personal life ==
Johns was married to fellow archaeologist and British Museum curator Donald Bailey. In 2005, the contributions of both Johns and Bailey to the world of archaeology was recognised with the publication of a festschrift in their honour, titled Image, Craft and the Classical World: Essays in honour of Donald Bailey and Catherine Johns. Johns wrote an obituary for her husband for The Guardian following his death in September 2014.

== Select bibliography ==
- Johns, C. 1982. Sex or Symbol? Erotic Images of Greece and Rome. London, British Museum.
- Potter, T. W. and Johns, C. 1992. Roman Britain (Exploring the Roman World). University of California Press.
- Johns, C. 1996. The jewellery of Roman Britain : Celtic and classical traditions. Ann Arbor, University of Michigan Press.
- Johns, C. and Burnett, A. 1997. The Snettisham Roman jeweller's hoard. London, British Museum.
- Johns, C. 2005. Little Book of Erotica. London, British Museum.
- Johns, C. 2006. Horses : history, myth, art. Cambridge, Massachusetts, Harvard University Press.
- Johns, C. 2008. Dogs : history, myth, art. Cambridge, Massachusetts, Harvard University Press.
