= Secret Museum, Naples =

Collection of sexually explicit finds from Pompeii

Coordinates: 40°51′13″N 14°15′2″E

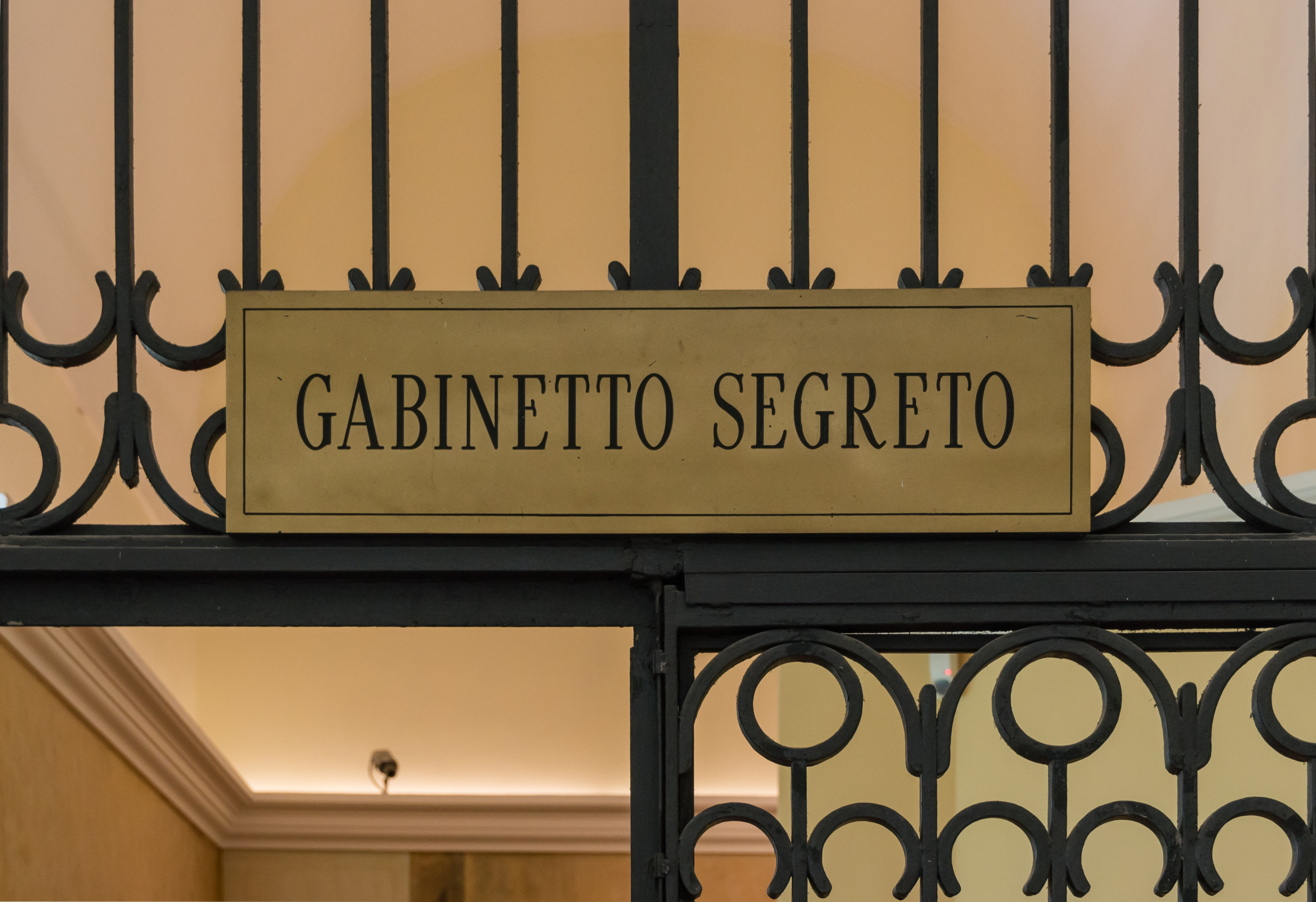
Entrance to the Gabinetto Segreto

The Secret Museum or Secret Cabinet (Italian: Gabinetto Segreto) in Naples is the collection of 1st-century Roman erotic art found in Pompeii and Herculaneum, now held in separate galleries at the National Archaeological Museum, the former Museo Borbonico. The term "cabinet" is used in reference to the "cabinet of curiosities" - i.e. any well-presented collection of objects to admire and study.

== History ==
Re-opened, closed, re-opened again and then closed again for nearly 100 years, the secret room was briefly made accessible again at the end of the 1960s before being finally re-opened in 2000. Since 2005 the collection has been kept in a separate room in the Naples National Archaeological Museum.

Although the excavation of Pompeii was initially an Enlightenment project, once artifacts were classified through a new method of taxonomy, those deemed obscene and unsuitable for the general public were termed pornography and in 1821 they were locked away in a Secret Museum. The doorway was bricked up in 1849.

At Pompeii, locked metal cabinets were constructed over erotic frescos, which could be shown, for an additional fee, to gentlemen but not to ladies. This peep show was still in operation at Pompeii in the 1960s. The cabinet was only accessible to "people of mature age and respected morals", which in practice meant only educated men.

The museum closed from February 2020 to August 2021.

== Collection ==
Throughout ancient Pompeii and Herculaneum, erotic frescoes, depictions of the god Priapus, sexually explicit symbols and inscriptions, and household items such as phallic oil lamps were found. The ancient Roman understanding of sexuality viewed explicit material very differently from most present-day cultures. (Note: For Roman views of sexuality, see Paul Veyne, "Pleasures and excesses" in A History of Private Life: From Pagan Rome to Byzantium, Philippe Ariès and Georges Duby, eds. (Harvard University Press) 1987: 183–207.) Ideas about obscenity developed from the 18th century to the present day into a modern concept of pornography.

The collection contains approx. 250 items. The catalogue of the secret museum was also a form of censorship, as engravings and descriptive texts played down the content of the room.

== Gallery ==
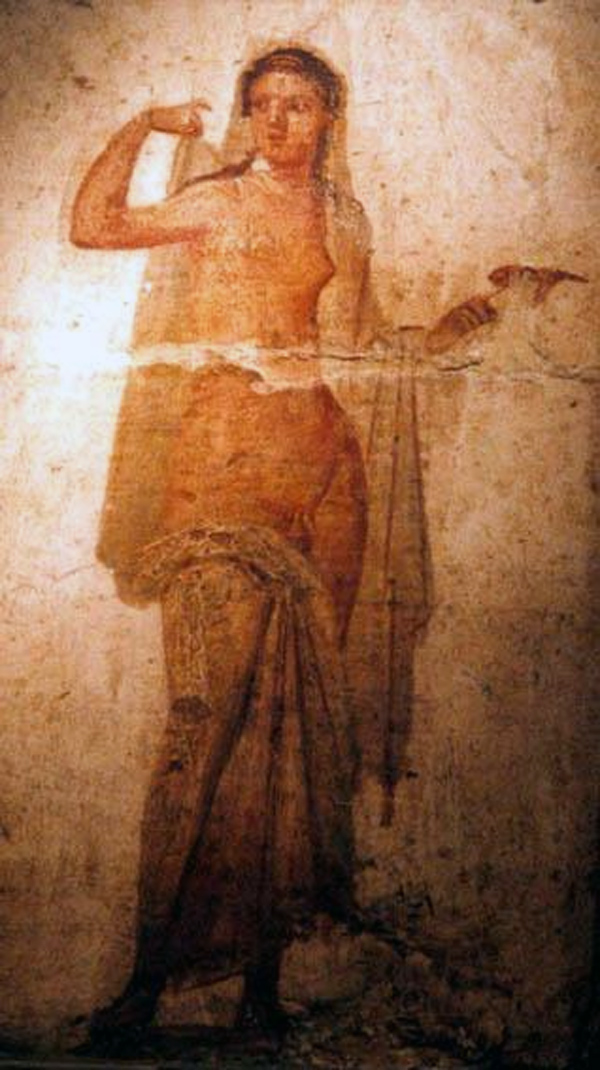
Hermaphroditus. Wall painting from Herculaneum. 1 CE – 50 CE

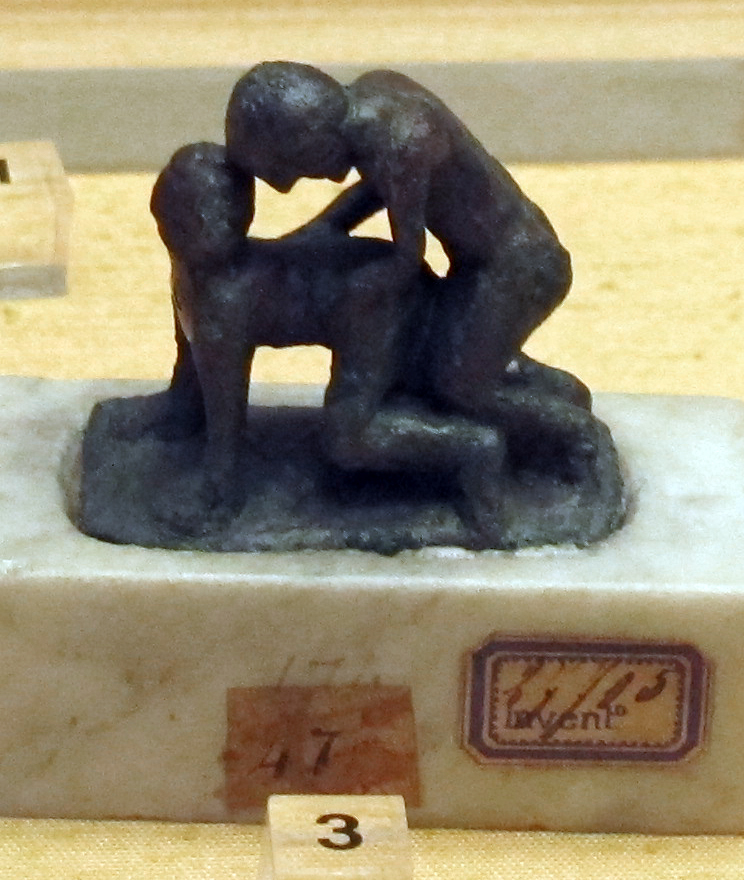
Sculpture depicting sex

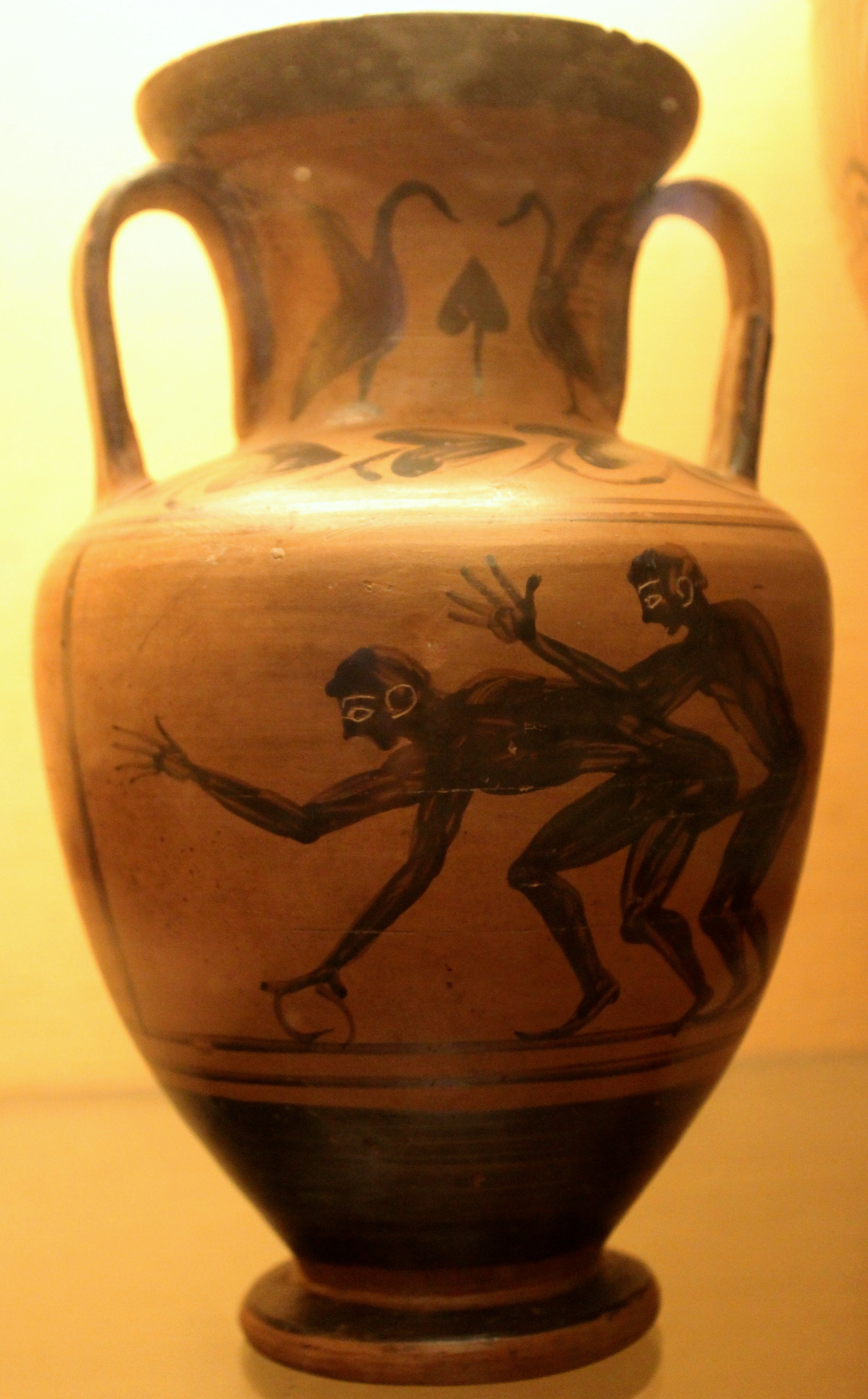
Anal sex between two males. Etruscan amphora. 5th century BCE

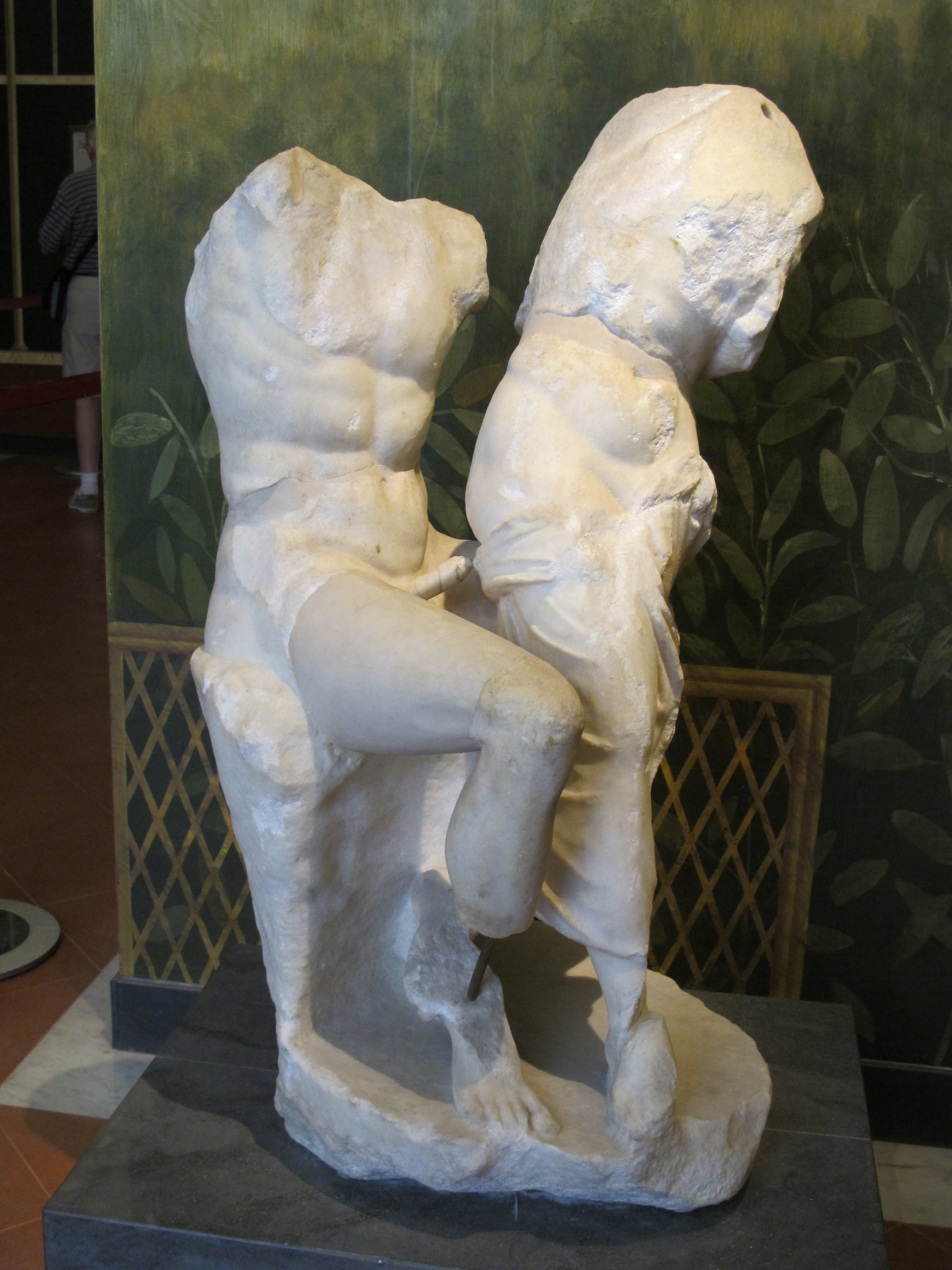
Marble statue of Satyr and Nymph. From Pollena Trocchia

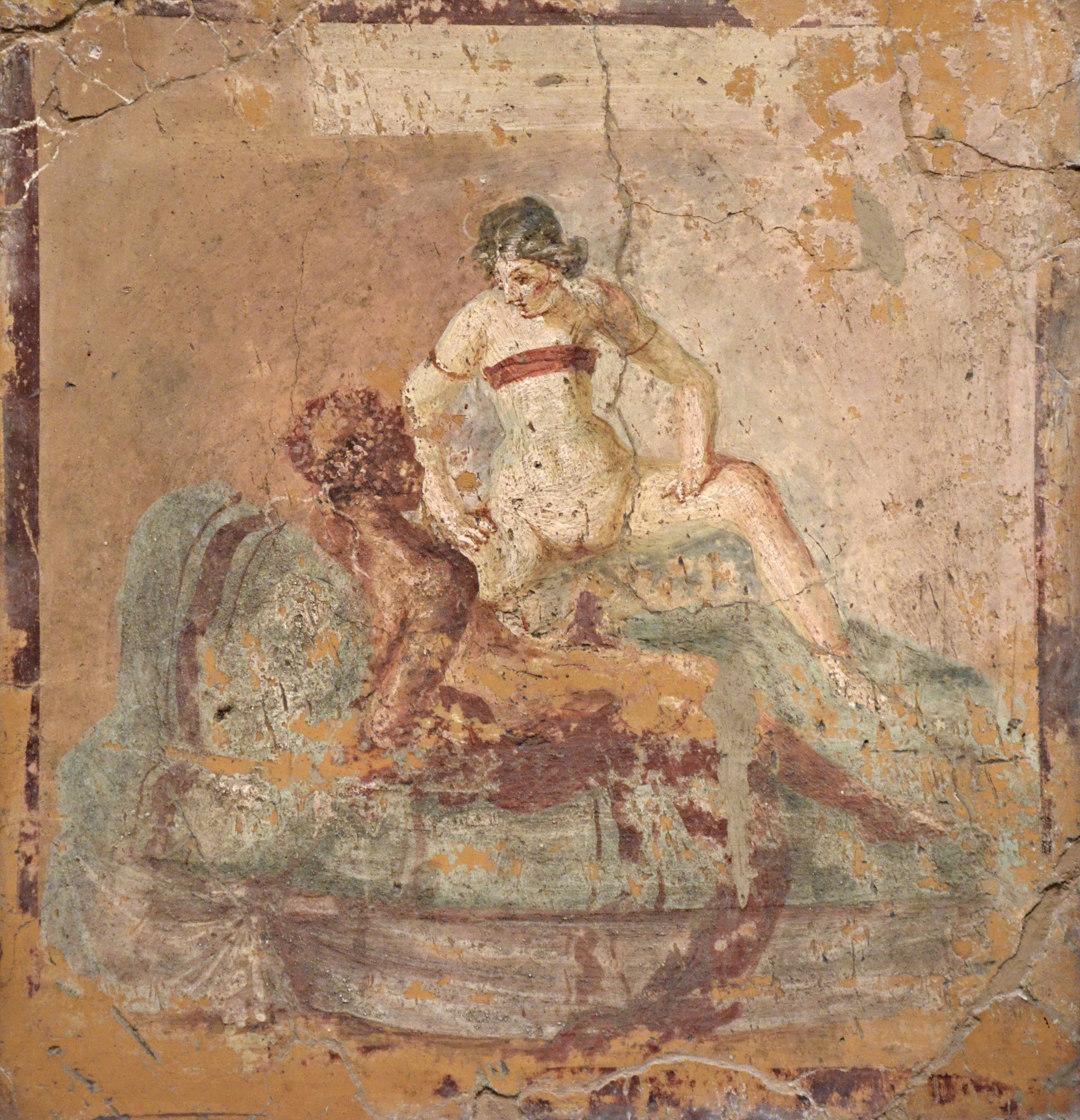
Sexual scene from Pompeii in the Secret Museum

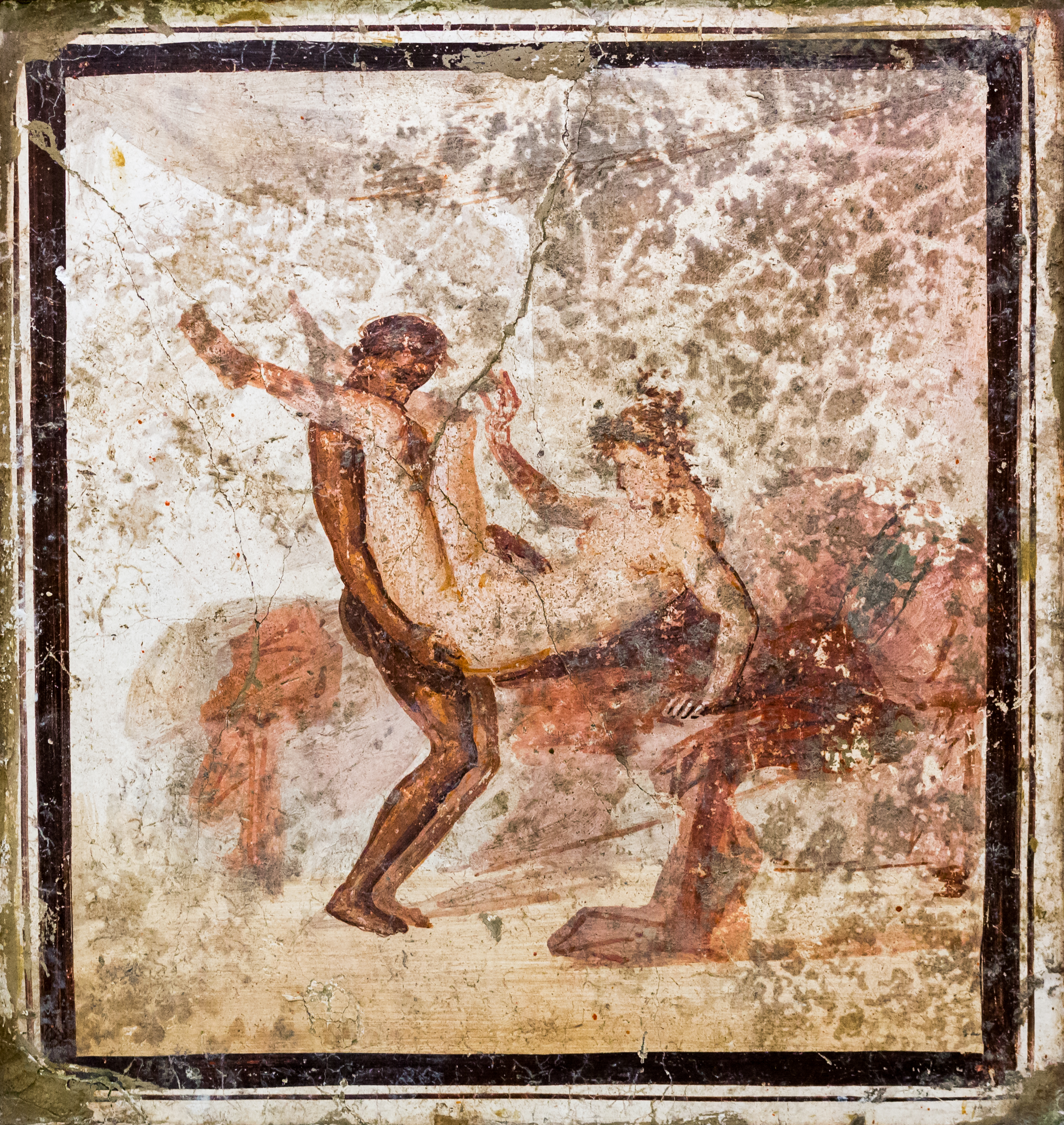
Sexual scene from Pompeii in the Secret Museum

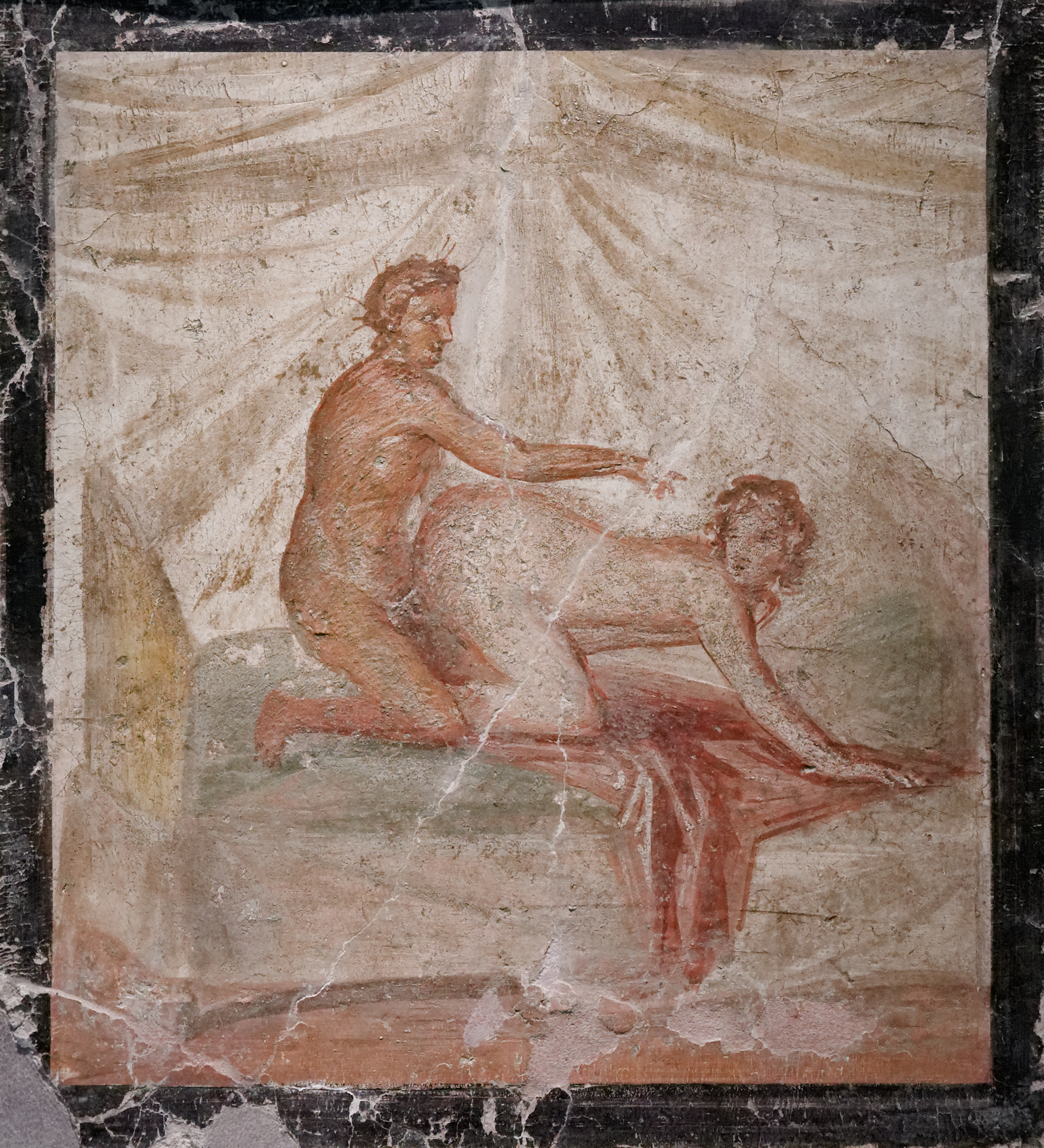
Sexual scene from Pompeii in the Secret Museum

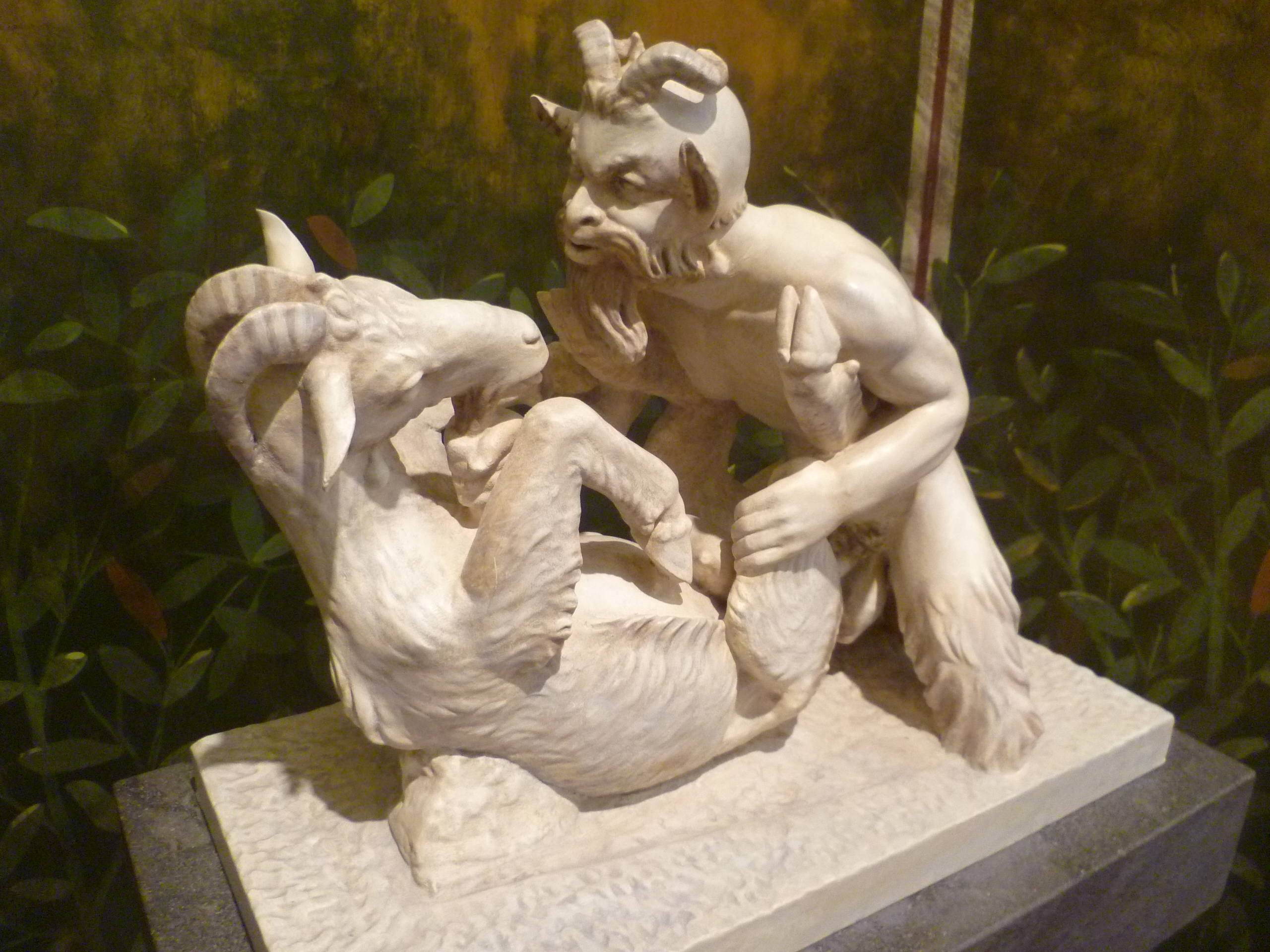
Pan copulating with goat, 1st century BCE – 1st century CE

== See also ==
- Erotic art in Pompeii and Herculaneum
- History of erotic depictions
- History of human sexuality
- Homosexuality in ancient Greece
- Homosexuality in ancient Rome
- Sexuality in ancient Rome
