= Suppressed Safe collection =

Books unavailable to readers at the British Library

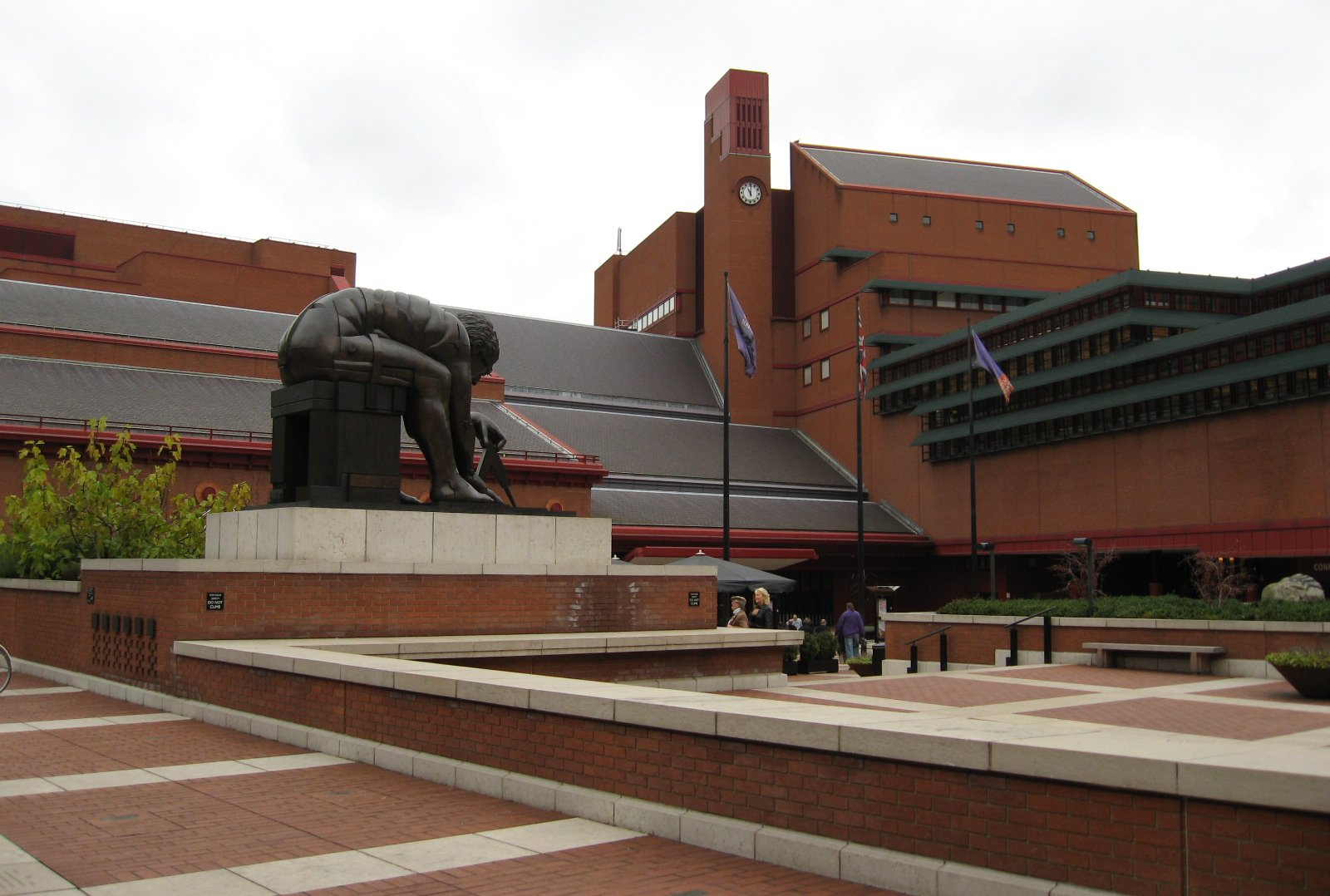
Exterior of the British Library

The Suppressed Safe collection are those books held by the British Library that readers are not permitted to access. There are several reasons for the suppression, including seditious publications, those subversive of religion and works that could later be deemed by the courts as libellous. Other classifications of suppressed books include those which are infringing copyright, those with typographical errors that are withdrawn at the request of the publishers and those given to the library on condition they are not released for a certain period.

== Suppressed works ==
The British Museum and the British Library

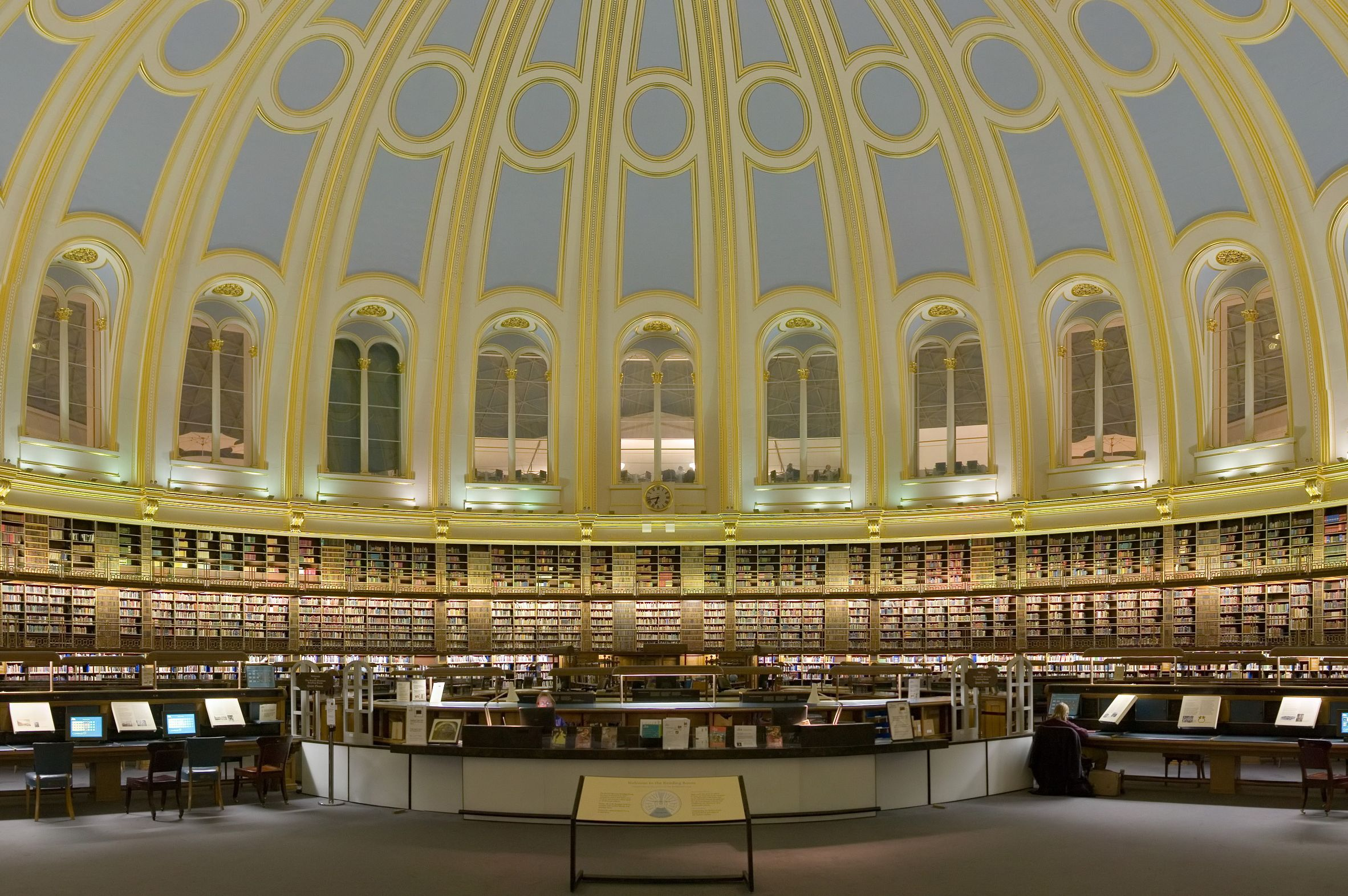
The British Museum Reading Room

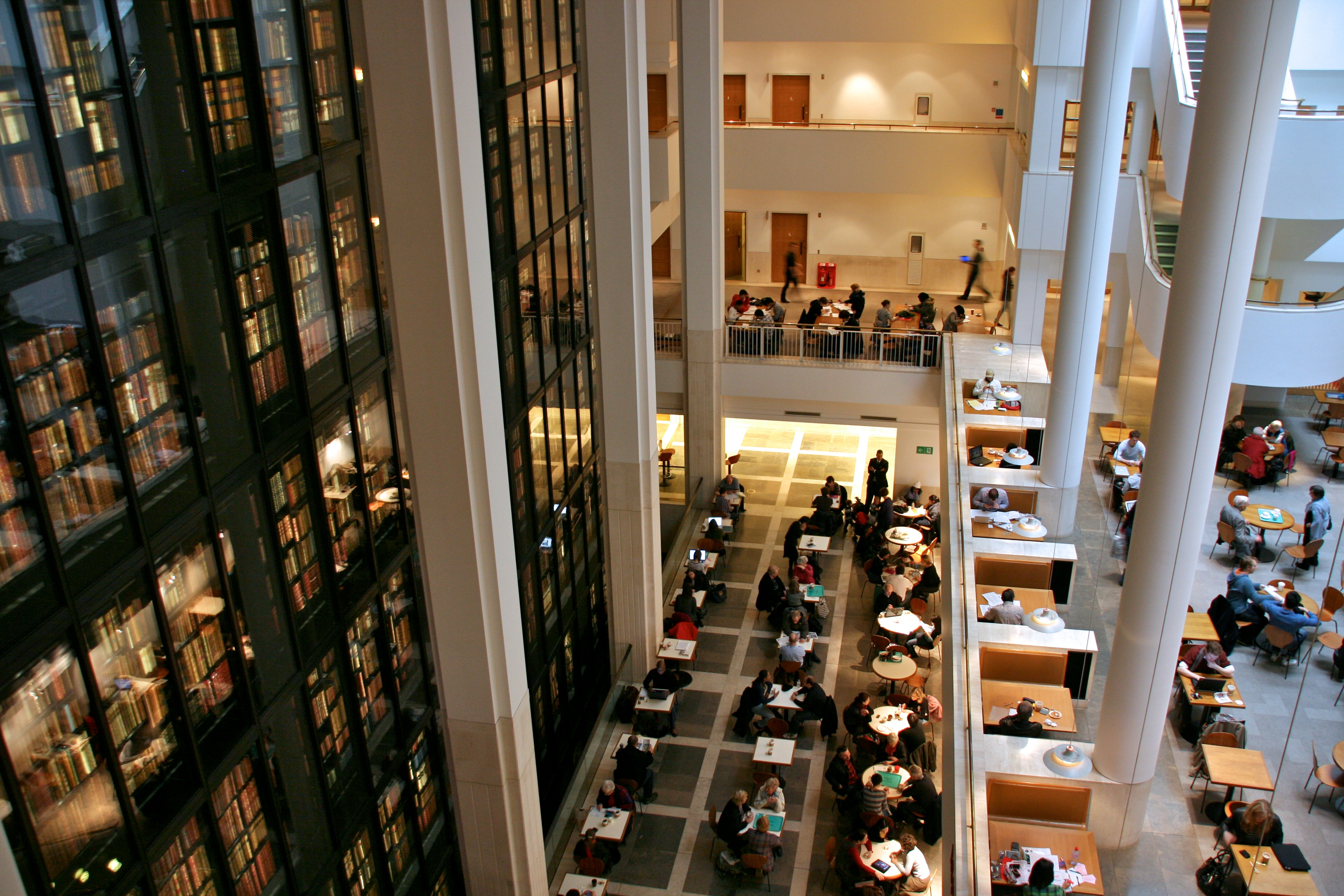
Interior of the British Library, showing the King's Library

The British Library was created on 1 July 1973 as a result of the British Library Act 1972. Into the new body were combined the library holdings of the British Museum, the National Central Library and the National Lending Library for Science and Technology. The library later also incorporated the British National Bibliography, the Office for Scientific and Technical Information, the India Office Library and Records and the British Institute of Recorded Sound. The British Museum Library, which provided most of the British Library's collection in 1973, was formed in June 1753 as a result of the British Museum Act 1753. The Act provided for the purchase of the Collection of Sir Hans Sloane; the Cotton Library, assembled by Sir Robert Cotton; the Harleian Library, the collection of the Robert Harley, 1st Earl of Oxford and Earl Mortimer; and the King's Library of George III.

The British Library is one of six legal deposit libraries in the UK and Ireland and the only one to have a right to automatically receive a copy of every printed work published in the UK. (Note: The other legal deposit libraries in the British Isles covered by the Agency for the Legal Deposit Libraries are Cambridge University Library, University of Oxford's Bodleian Library, the National Library of Scotland, the National Library of Wales and the Library of Trinity College Dublin.) In addition to books, this also includes pamphlets, magazines, newspapers, sheet music and maps. Certain digital material is also collected under legal deposit, including some websites, e-journals and CD-ROMs. As part of the requirement of being a legal deposit organisation, the books they receive include pornographic or salacious material, seditious publications, those subversive of religion and works that could later be deemed by the courts as libellous. Such works were accepted by the library, but not released into their general access collections or details of them placed on the catalogue.

In the early 20th century, the library split the segregated books into two collections. The pornography and erotic literature they placed in the Private Case—a lockable cabinet in the library's basement—with the shelfmark P.C. The libellous and subversive works they gave the name the Suppressed Safe collection and the shelfmark S.S. This was locked in the cupboard of the keeper of printed books until they were moved into seven safes in the basement. In the 1970s N. F. Sharp, a keeper in the department of printed books at the British Museum Library, described the works in the Suppressed Safe collection as

those which have been pronounced libellous by a court, those which have been found to infringe copyright, and those which are at the time of deposit confidential. There are also certain other books which were originally presented to the Museum on condition that their presence in its library should not for a period of time be revealed.

The historian and bibliophile Patrick J. Kearney also described how some works containing typographical errors were withdrawn at the request of the publishers. These include a monograph on the Dutch glass engraver Frans Greenwood which was requested to be withdrawn because of typographical errors that included the subject being incorrectly spelled as "Frank" on the title page. Kearney concludes that "it seems likely that printing or binding problems may account for the bulk of the suppressions".

== See also ==
- Secretum (British Museum)

== Notes and references ==
=== Sources ===
==== Books ====
- Cross, Paul (1991). "The Private Case: A History". In Harris, P. R. (ed.). The Library of the British Museum: Retrospective Essays on the Department of Printed Books. London: The British Library. pp. 201–240. ISBN 978-0-7123-0242-5.
- Fryer, Peter (1966). Private Case – Public Scandal: Secrets of the British Museum Revealed. London: Secker and Warburg. OCLC 314927730.

==== Journals and magazines ====
- Haynes, E. S. P. (December 1913). "The Taboos of the British Museum Library". The English Review: 123–134.

==== Websites ====
- "About the Agency for the Legal Deposit Libraries". Legal Deposit Libraries. Archived from the original on 15 November 2022.
- "History of the British Library". The British Library. Archived from the original on 30 July 2018.
- "History of the British Museum". The British Museum. Archived from the original on 15 March 2023.
- Kearney, Patrick J.; Boothroyd, David (2013). "Notes Towards a Catalogue of the British Library's S.S. Collection" (PDF). Scissors & Paste.
- "Legal Deposit". The British Library. Archived from the original on 19 March 2023.
