= Private Case =

Collection of erotica at the British Library

- The Private Case collection in 1968
- Housed at: British Library
- Established: 1836–1870
- Dissolved: 1983
- Funded by: British Library; Henry Spencer Ashbee; Eric Dingwall; Charles Reginald Dawes; Beecher Moore
- Access requirements: Open access
- Size (no. of items): c. 2,500 items
- Criteria for collection: Obscene material
- Website: Private Case

The Private Case is a collection of erotica and pornography held initially by the British Museum and then, from 1973, by the British Library. The collection began between 1836 and 1870 and grew from the receipt of books from legal deposit, from the acquisition of bequests and, in some cases, from requests made to the police following their seizures of obscene material.

From its foundation in the eighteenth century, the British Museum acted as the national library of Britain. It was one of six legal deposit libraries in automatic receipt of all works published in the UK; this included pornographic or salacious material, seditious publications, those subversive of religion and works that could later be deemed by the courts as libellous. From the nineteenth century, the subversive and libellous material was separated into the Suppressed Safe collection while the erotica and pornography were placed in a locked cupboard known as the Private Case. Access to the material was restricted, and the catalogue of Private Case publications was not released to the library's general readership.

The contents of the Private Case collection changed over time, shrinking as works were declassified and put into the general collection, and growing when the library received bequests and donations from collectors. Some of these were large: the book collector Henry Spencer Ashbee's 1900 bequest contained 1,379 volumes of erotica; the anthropologist Eric Dingwall—an honorary assistant keeper to the department of printed books—donated several works during his lifetime and at his death; and in 1964 the bibliophile Charles Reginald Dawes bequeathed 246 works of erotic literature.

From 1964—and reflecting the increasing liberalisation of social mores of the time—the library began to liberalise its approach to works in the Private Case, revising the collection and moving items onto the general catalogue for general access, a process that was completed in 1983. There have been no new entries in the Private Case since 1990 and all new erotic or pornographic material is openly accessible and listed in the general catalogue. There is no restriction on access to the Private Case material, except for some items which are in a fragile condition. At its largest, the collection comprised some 4,000 works; as at 2023 about 2,500 volumes were still classified by the library as part of the Private Case.

== Background ==
The British Museum and the British Library

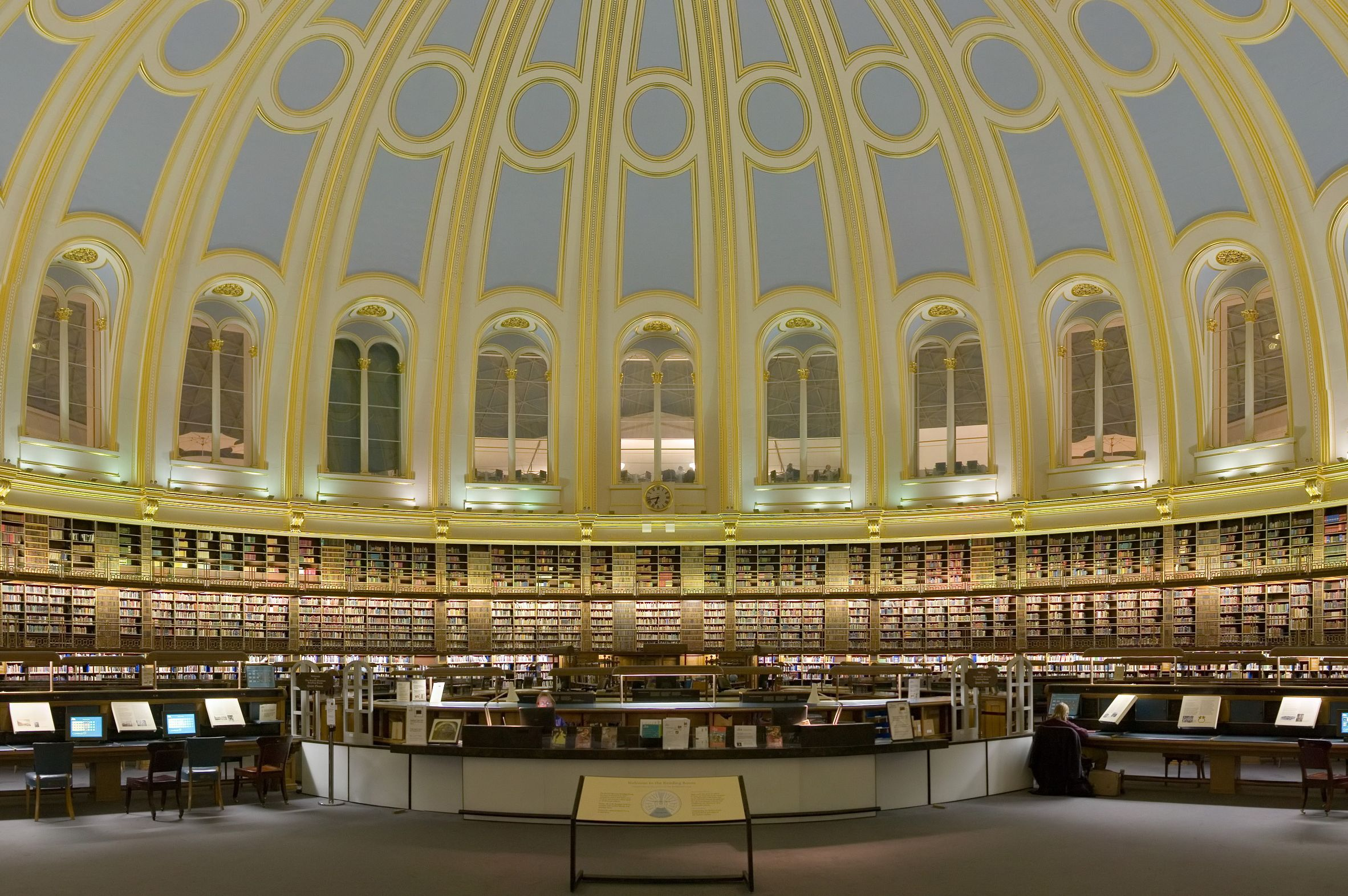
The British Museum Reading Room

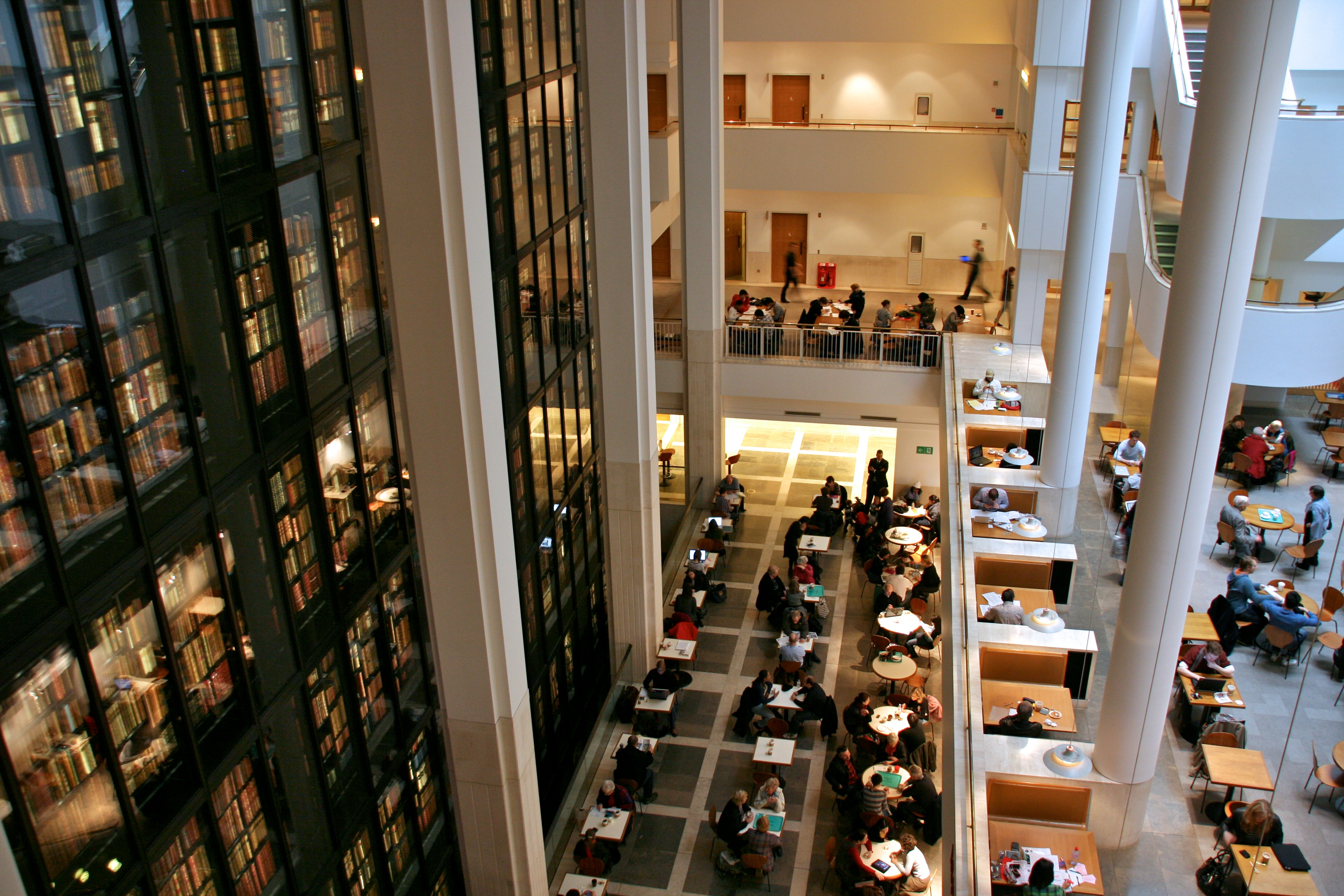
Interior of the British Library, showing the King's Library

The British Museum Act created the British Museum in June 1753. The Act provided for the purchase of the collection of the physician and collector Sir Hans Sloane and the Cotton library, assembled by the antiquarian Sir Robert Cotton; the Harleian Library, the collection of the Robert Harley, 1st Earl of Oxford and Earl Mortimer. The British Library Act 1972 created the British Library on 1 July 1973. Into the new body were combined the library holdings of the British Museum—which provided most of the British Library's collection—the National Central Library and the National Lending Library for Science and Technology. The library later also incorporated the holdings of the British National Bibliography, the Office for Scientific and Technical Information, the India Office Library and Records and the British Institute of Recorded Sound.

The British Library is one of six legal deposit libraries in the UK and Ireland, and the only one to have a right to automatically receive a copy of every printed work published in the UK. (Note: The other legal deposit libraries in the British Isles covered by the Agency for the Legal Deposit Libraries are Cambridge University Library, the University of Oxford's Bodleian Library, the National Library of Scotland, the National Library of Wales and the Library of Trinity College Dublin. The Library of Trinity College Dublin is the only non-UK library that has UK legal deposit status, a position it has held since 1801.) (Note: The five other legal deposit institutions all have the right to request publications; the British Library does not have to request them.) In addition to books, this includes pamphlets, magazines, newspapers, sheet music and maps. Certain digital material is also collected under legal deposit, including some websites, e-journals and CD-ROMs. As a legal deposit organisation the works they receive include pornographic or salacious material, seditious publications, those subversive of religion and works that are potentially libellous. Historically, such works have been accepted by the library, but some were not released into their general access collections or were not included on the publicly accessible catalogue. As well as the legal deposit works lodged with the library, they would also receive private donations and posthumous bequests from collectors, including those who amassed works of erotica and pornography; these were also accepted, but not put in the general access collection.

== History ==
=== Nineteenth century ===
Early works held in the Private Case

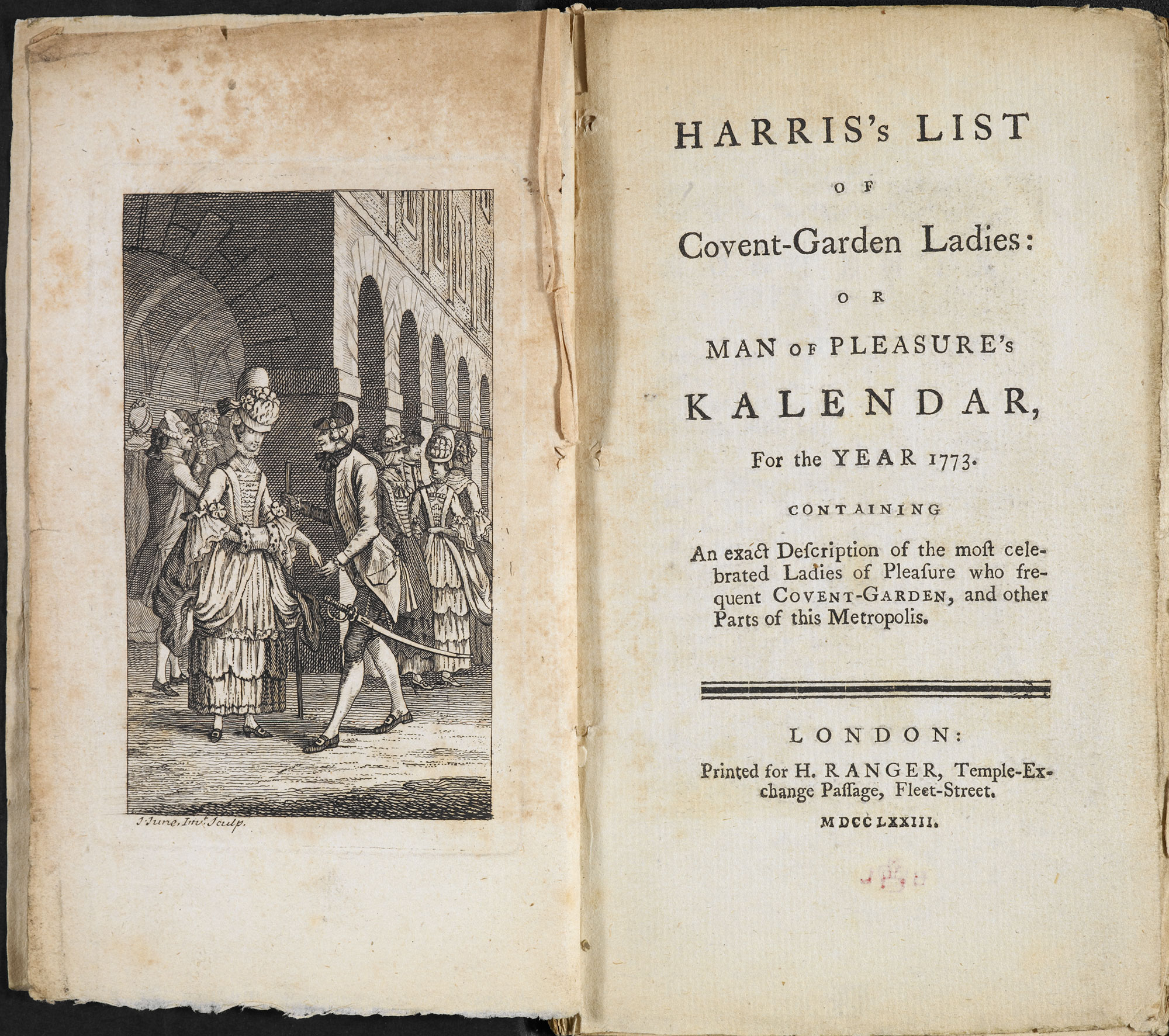
Frontispiece and title page of Harris's List of Covent Garden Ladies (1773) by Samuel Derrick

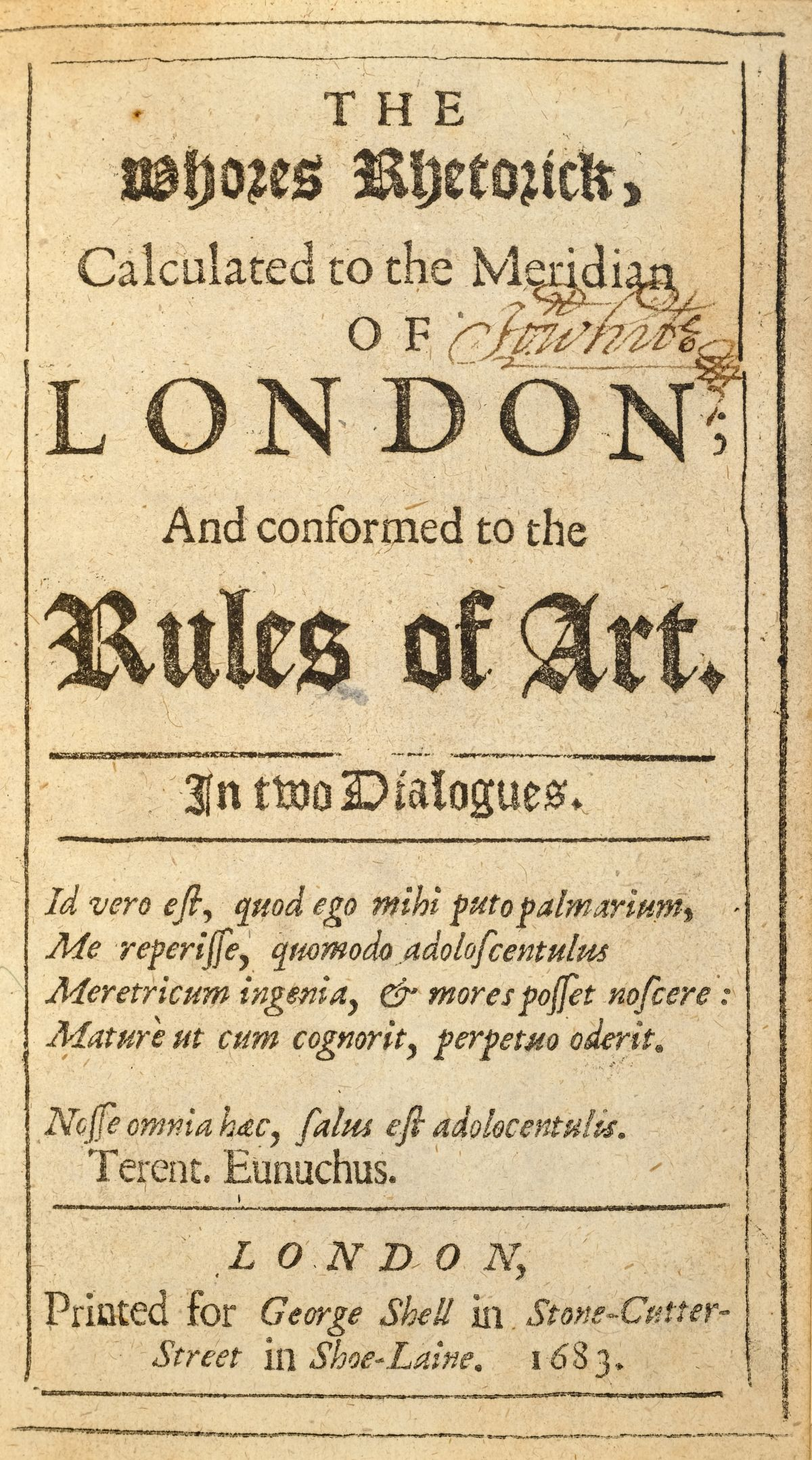
Title page of The Whore's Rhetorick (1683) by "Philp-Puttanus", a pseudonym of Ferrante Pallavicino

There are no records in the minutes of the British Museum trustees' meetings or within the records of the librarians regarding the opening of the Private Case, and no accurate date when it happened. Philip Harris, a former deputy keeper at the British Museum Library, records that in 1836 the Reverend Henry Baber—when he held the post of Keeper of the Printed Books—reported to a parliamentary select committee that young men should not have access to improper French novels, and that he had locked up such works, particularly those with illustrations, and they would only be released upon application to himself. This, Harris notes, was the beginning of what became the Private Case. Paul Cross, a member of staff of the British Library, puts the date of the case's opening at approximately 1841, while the library was under the leadership of Sir Henry Ellis and Anthony Panizzi was the Keeper of Printed Books. The process was continued by Panizzi's successor John Winter Jones, who did not inform the library's trustees or officials of the practice of withholding books from circulation. The historian Peter Fryer, in his study of the Private Case, considers the case began in 1856 or later; the cultural critic Gershon Legman estimates that it began operating between 1866 and 1870, based on the dates of the early accessions.

According to Cross and Harris, between the late 1830s or early 1840s and 1854 the collection grew to 27 books, then to 60 by 1860 and by 1864 the collection grew to 78 items. The collection included several works published pseudonymously, as was common at the time. These included works such as The Crafty Whore (1658) by the Italian author Pietro Aretino (translated by Richard Head from the original Italian); The Whore's Rhetorick (1683) by Philp-Puttanus (a pseudonym of the Italian writer Ferrante Pallavicino); A New Description of Merryland (1741) by Roger Pheuquewell (a pseudonym of Thomas Stretzer); The Natural History of the Frutex Vulvaria (1741) by Philogynes Clitorides; Teague-root Display'd (1746) by Paddy Strong-Cock; Matrimonial Ceremonies Display'd (1748); Harris's List of Covent Garden Ladies (1788–1790); The Cuckold's Chronicle (1793); and Paradise Lost; or The Great Dragon Cast Out (1838) by Lucian Redivivus.

Some publishers of pornographic material did not forward their works to the British Museum Library. A boom in pornography was seen in the 1850s, much of it generated from the publishing houses in Holywell Street, London, which were known for their output of pornographic books. (Note: In 1834 the Society for the Suppression of Vice reported that there were 57 pornography shops in Holywell Street, which was the centre for the trade in London. Following the Obscene Publications Act 1857, many of them were closed down.) Some pornographic publishers, such as William Dugdale, never sent their works to the library, which meant they had to be acquired later by the library either through purchase or from a donation.

In 1865 the antiquarian George Witt gifted his phallicism collection to the British Museum; much of this went into the museum's Secretum—their room for items deemed obscene—with the printed matter going into the Private Case. One of the works was Des divinités génératrices, ou, Du culte du phallus (1805) which was, like many of his works, personally monogrammed. By 1885 the catalogue for the Private Case had changed, with 108 former entries removed and 49 new works added. Although it is likely that the Private Case collection began as a lockable case, by 1890 the collection had expanded to fill 12 cupboards.

=== Twentieth and twenty-first centuries ===
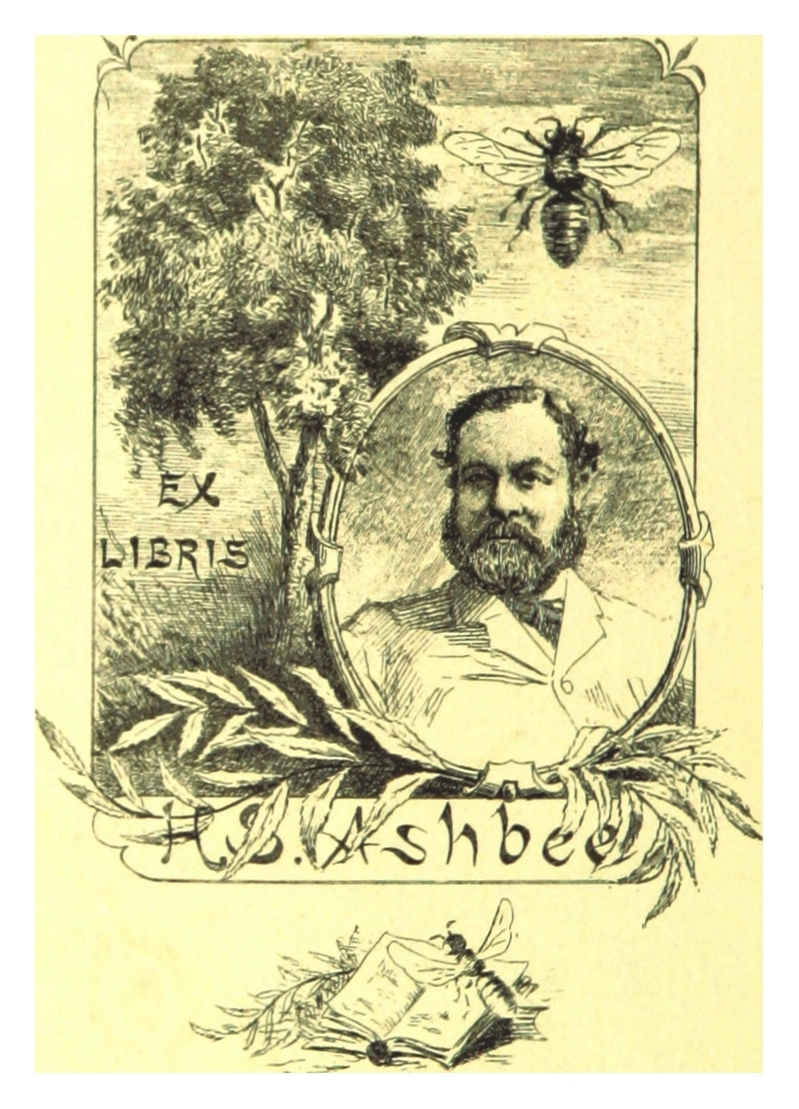
A book-plate used by Henry Spencer Ashbee

The bibliophile Henry Spencer Ashbee made a bequest to the library in 1900 of 15,299 volumes containing 8,764 works, of which 1,379 volumes were classed as erotica. The non-contentious works were entered into the library's general catalogue, and duplicates disposed of. Erotica was put into the Private Case; any duplicated works were destroyed. The remaining works included Le Caleçon des coquettes du jour (1763); La Masturbomanie ou jouissance solitaire (1830); Anandria, ou Confessions de Mademoiselle Sapho, avec la clef (1866) by "la citoyenne Raucourt"; Das Kind der Lust, oder die Freuden des Genusses (1873); The Romance of Lust (1873–1876); La Joie du pornographe; ou, Nouveau recueil d'amusemens (1884); as well as several editions of Fanny Hill by the English novelist John Cleland, and the works of the French eroticist the Marquis de Sade. Also included in his bequest were three volumes of bibliographies of erotica he compiled; titled Index Librorum Prohibitorum (1877), Centuria Librorum Absconditorum (1879) and Catena Librorum Tacendorum (1885), Ashbee published them under the pseudonym Pisanus Fraxi. (Note: "Pisanus Fraxi" is described by Ashbee's biographer David Chambers as "a scatological anagram of the Latin words for ash and bee, fraxinus apis".)

In the early 20th century, the library split the segregated books into two collections. They placed the pornography and erotic literature in the Private Case—a lockable cabinet in the library's basement—with the shelf-mark P.C. The libellous and subversive works were given the name the Suppressed Safe collection and the shelf-mark S.S. They were locked in the cupboard of the keeper of printed books until they were moved into seven safes in the basement. (Note: Because of the nature of the books in the Suppressed Safe collection—sometimes being held there because of legal requirements—it remains a closed collection, with no access to readers.)

By 1913 the Private Case contained not just works of pornography or erotica, but serious works on sex, including the six-volume work Studies in the Psychology of Sex (1897–1910) by Havelock Ellis and Edward Carpenter's The Intermediate Sex (1908); the latter was available in the general catalogues of several academic and public libraries, but confined to the Private Case in the British Museum Library. Other inclusions were some issues of The Englishwoman's Domestic Magazine—although most of the issues remained on in the general collection—as they contained articles about flogging girls. In 1920 David Lindsay, 27th Earl of Crawford, a trustee of the museum, bequeathed over 200 works of erotica to the museum "for preservation or destruction at the discretion of the Trustees". The library destroyed the duplicated books and the remainder went into the Private Case.

In around 1934 the bibliophile and collector Alfred Rose was given permission to copy the internal catalogue of the Private Case. He took details of the titles present in the case and also included the works of other collections of erotica in major libraries. Rose published the book under the pseudonym Rolf S. Reade, an anagram of his name. Titled Registrum Librorum Eroticorum, it lists 5,061 works. By the time the book was published in 1936, Rose had died. (Note: With Rose's death, the printer took little care with the printing and introduced several errors, making it of limited use.) On his death, Rose bequeathed seven works of erotica to the library, including The Bride's Confession (1917); The Festival of the Passions (1863); and The Dialogues of Luisa Sigea (1890) by Nicolas Chorier. According to Cross, the books donated are "of exceptional interest".

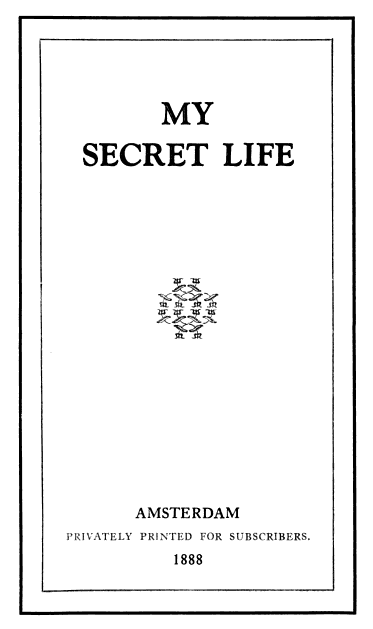
The title page of a My Secret Life reprint published in 1888

In 1950 the Private Case was expanded by the receipt of the Eliot–Phelips collection, formed by Edward Phelips, which had been held by the Guildhall Library, London. Among the 33 works they received were Sodome (1888) and Gomorrhe (1889) by Henri d'Argis; Odor di Femina (1919) by Edmond Dumoulin; and Ma Vie secrète (1923). The last of these was a French translation of the English novel My Secret Life, possibly written by Ashbee or William Haywood.

In 1946 the anthropologist Eric Dingwall was appointed honorary assistant keeper to the department of printed books of the British Museum, where he curated the Private Case. In 1967 he negotiated with the police to obtain what was described as "44 magazines and 15 other articles" they had seized in a raid in Brighton, East Sussex. When the police asked if the museum had particular authority to obtain the material, J. L. Wood, the assistant keeper of printed books, informed them that:

as the National Library, we have a duty to collect any material which will serve for study and research and we already possess a collection of material of the kind you describe in your letter, kept under conditions of special security.

Among the items given over were twenty-one "Soho typescripts", also known as "Soho bibles". These were pornographic books published in the 1950s and 1960s and associated with the sex shops of Soho, the centre of London's sex industry, but also sold under the counter by provincial bookdealers. Typically they were handmade—typed texts which were then mimeographed with card covers stapled—and produced in small quantities.

Dingwall also donated several works to the museum which he had purchased privately, including 44 works of erotica, mostly in German, which he gave in 1947; these included typewritten and carbon copy works of the 1920s from German flagellation clubs. Between 1951 and 1955 he acquired and donated 38 works, including Frank and Ich by Georges Grassal, Nini à Lesbos by Jacques des Linettes and 3 books pederastic in nature. One of the works Dingwall acquired for the museum was a first edition (1749) of Fanny Hill; Cross describes the book as "of exceptional rarity and historical importance". At his death in 1986, Dingwall bequeathed the British Library several works, including de Sade's La philosophie dans le boudoir (1795) and Le roman de Violette (1870), as well as several bibliographies of erotica.

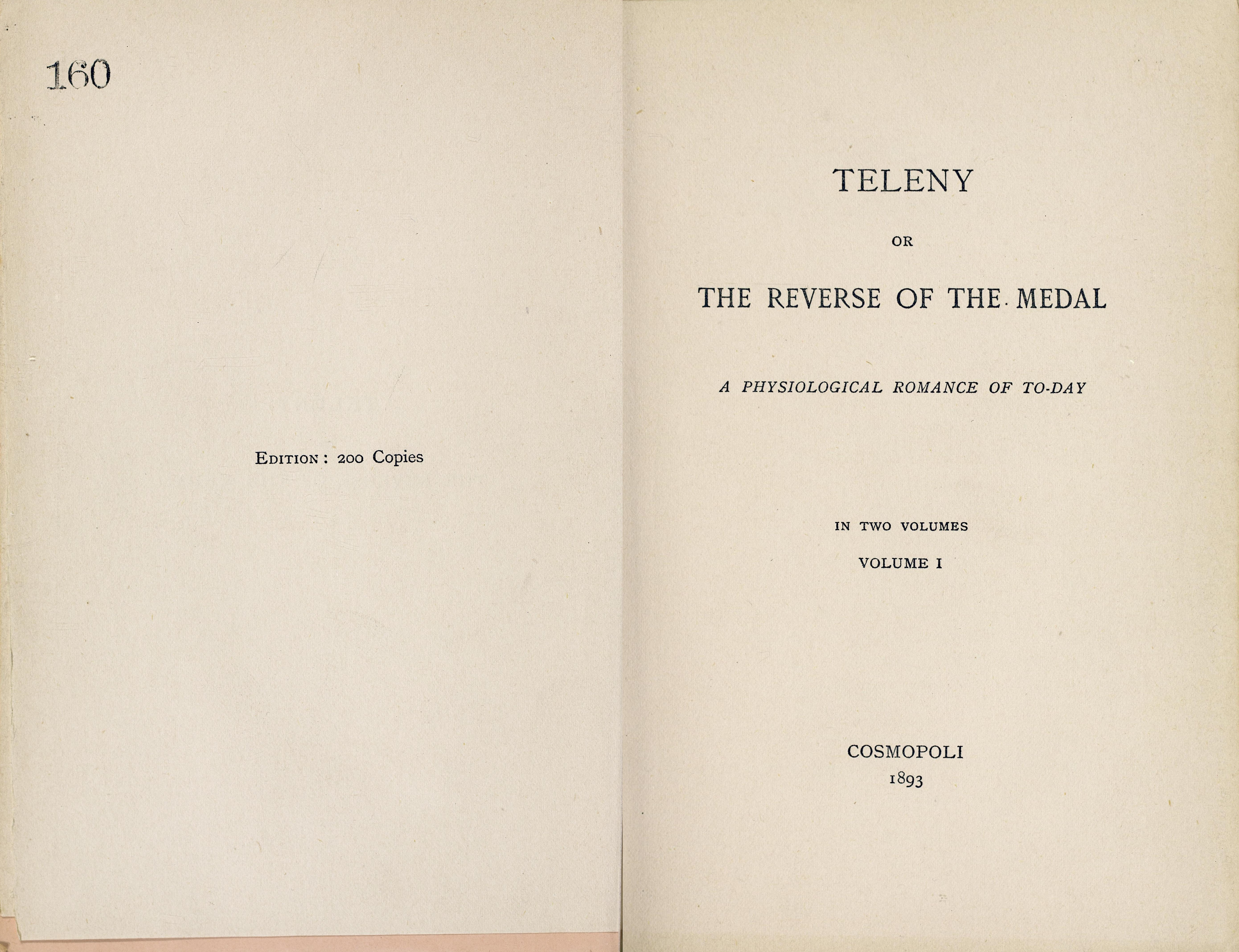
Title page of Teleny (1893), an early work of gay erotic fiction, speculatively attributed to Oscar Wilde

In 1964 the British Museum Library received a bequest of 246 works of erotic literature from Charles Reginald Dawes; (Note: Dawes was an independently wealthy son of a metal broker; he was a book collector who published The Marquis de Sade: His Life and Works (1927) and Restif de la Bretonne 1734–1806 (1946). He also wrote, but never published two further works: Study of Erotic Literature in England and a work on homosexuality in ancient Rome. Writing in 1966, Fryer called Dawes Britain's "last great collector of erotica".) according to Cross, writing in 1991, "many scholars now consider to be of more importance than the Ashbee erotica collection". The Dawes bequest included four editions of Fanny Hill; The Memoirs of Dolly Morton; five editions of works by de Sade; and Teleny, or The Reverse of the Medal, an early work of gay erotic fiction, published anonymously but speculatively attributed—in part at least—to Oscar Wilde. Also included was Dawes's copy of My Secret Life (1889–1895), an 11-volume first edition, which was one of the 25 copies printed. Dawes had much of his collection bound in Morocco leather or calfskin, and included his book-plate.

In 1964 the collector Beecher Moore gave his collection to the library. Moore—a friend of Stephen Ward, one of the central figures in the Profumo affair—was investigated by the Metropolitan Police, as many of Ward's friends were. Moore was concerned by the police's comments about his collection; he donated it to the library as quickly as he could. Dingwall negotiated the division of the collection and its exchange between Moore, the museum and the Kinsey Institute for Sex Research. Most of the collection they obtained comprised French limited editions, although it also included erotica in English from the 1950s and 1960s. Some of the English works of pornography were deemed "duplicated material" and were turned down by the Keeper of Printed Books for inclusion into the library collection on the basis that "we are, after all, a library, not an institute of sexual research". The historian and bibliophile Patrick J. Kearney described Moore's collection as "not so rich in rarities as the Ashbee or Dawes collections", although it "provided the Private Case with a valuable cross-section of English erotica published on the continent".

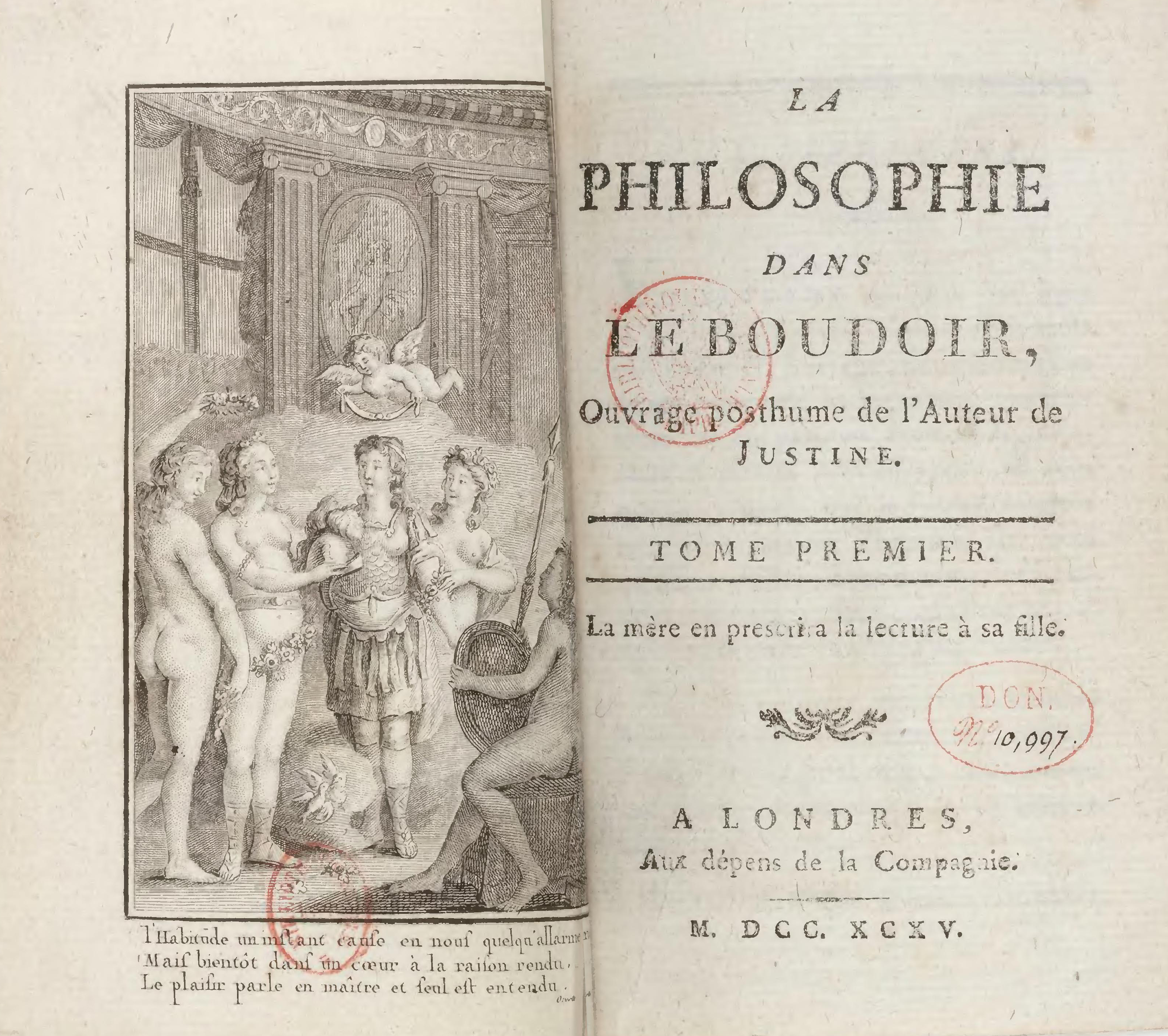
Frontispiece and title page of the Marquis de Sade's La philosophie dans le boudoir (1795)

Until the 1960s the procedure to obtain access to Private Case material was exacting; the historian Alison Moore described it as "particularly labyrinthine". The segregation of the Private Case material from the works in the general catalogue included the list of its contents, which meant readers were unaware the library held copies of the works. In the 1960s there were two copies of an official catalogue of the contents, both held by senior members of the library staff. To obtain access to a book, a reader had to write to the library and ask if they had a copy of the work; if this was confirmed, they could ask for access to it. The reader would then be invited for interview to ascertain if they were a serious scholar with a legitimate and reasonable rationale to access the material and not—as one principal librarian described it—involved in "indiscriminate browsing in the field of erotica". Holders of short-term reader's tickets were not allowed access to the Private Case, but those with longer-term tickets could apply in writing to the Principal Keeper to get access. This practice lasted from the inception of the case until the 1960s.

With the increasing liberalisation of social mores in the 1960s and the availability of many of the Private Case works in bookshops, in 1964 the library began to liberalise its approach to works in the Private Case, revising the catalogues and moving items to the general catalogue for general access. Because of what Harris calls "the bibliographical complexities" of the undertaking, the process took until 1983. According to Moore around a third of the Private Case was moved onto the general catalogue during the 1970s. In 1973, when the British Museum Library collection was passed to the control of the British Library, the illustrated pillow books in the Private Case, which contained no text, were transferred to the British Museum Department of Oriental Antiquities (now the museum's Department of Asia).

There have been no new entries into the Private Case since 1990. All new erotic or pornographic material is openly accessible and listed in the general catalogue, with no restrictions on access, except for some volumes, because of their fragile condition. At its largest, the collection comprised some 4,000 works, although as at 2023 there are about 2,500 volumes still classified by the library as being part of the collection; the library describes the Private Case as "a historical collection". In 2019 the contents of the Private Case were digitised and made available through the Gale subscription database Archives of Sexuality & Gender. Gale describes the Private Case material as "an interesting study in social ethics as the definition of obscenity evolved since the mid-19th century"; the British Library, while noting that nearly all the contents were "produced by heterosexual men for heterosexual men", describes the works as a "unique insight into historic attitudes towards gender, sexuality and obscenity".

== Historiography ==
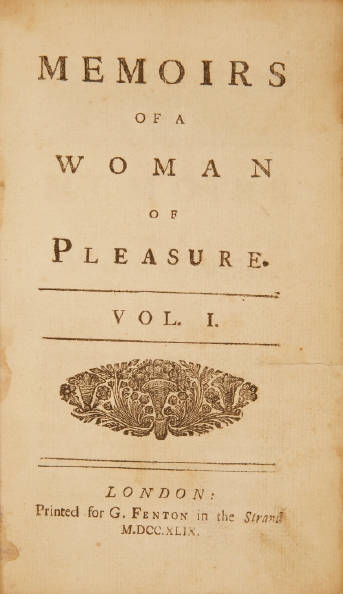
Title page of the 1749 edition of Memoirs of a Woman of Pleasure, better known as Fanny Hill

In 1913 the Bibliothèque nationale de France published a bibliography of its Collection de l'Enfer—the French equivalent of the Private Case. The move induced the lawyer and writer E. S. P. Haynes to produce "The Taboos of the British Museum Library", an essay in the literary magazine The English Review. Describing the existence of the Private Case as "unsatisfactory", he criticised the museum for censorship and wrote that "the reputation of our National Library is suffering in consequence" of the segregation of books. The library practice of keeping the names of Private Case books off the general catalogue he thought "a ruinous policy, and one which in the long run may prove suicidal. Students will tend to go elsewhere". He also stated that by censoring the existence of works in its holdings, the library "is placing itself in a most dubious position".

Despite Haynes's essay the wider public continued to be unaware of the existence of the Private Case until the 1960s and it was only in 1962 that the library acknowledged that it held a collection of books not included in the main general catalogue. The situation of the segregated books was not discussed more widely until 1963 when there was a debate in the correspondence pages of The Times Literary Supplement about the library's policy. One of those involved in the correspondence was Peter Fryer, who went on to publish Private Case—Public Scandal: Secrets of the British Museum Revealed in 1966; the book was part of what Harris calls Fryer's "courteous but persistent campaign on the subject".

Kearney catalogued the Private Case collection and published The Private Case: An Annotated Bibliography of the Private Case Erotica Collection in the British (Museum) Library in 1981, following seven years of research. It contains 1,920 items, although the material contains flaws. The historian A. S. G. Edwards, in an article for The Book Collector, calls the bibliography "of very limited usefulness", given that the book only details the works that were in the Private Case at the time of Kearney's research, and not the many items that had previously been in the case but had since been reclassified. Edwards also highlights flaws in attribution of some publications to anonymously produced books; in this way, Edwards says, it is "very hard for the user of this work to be sure of the dividing line between hard fact and authorial conjecture".

== Similar collections ==
The British Library is not the only research library that holds large amounts of pornography in its collections. The Bibliothèque nationale de France contains the Collection de l'Enfer, and the Library of Congress houses the Δ (Delta) collection (merged into the general collection in 1964). The Bodleian Library at the University of Oxford classifies their collection as Φ (Phi)—a joke that a reader viewing the material may exclaim "Fie!" The tower of Cambridge University Library was rumoured to store a collection of pornographic materials, but they hold only a small collection of such works. These were once held in the collection named the "Arc"—from the Latin Arcana, or "secret things"—and by 2015 this amounted to 1,200 works of 1,000 titles, mostly "libellous works and graphic pictorial works". The Widener Library at Harvard University used to class its pornographic holdings as "Inferno"—which it later shorted to "I°". The Yale University Library classified "obscene" and other limited-access holdings as "Zeta". The library at Trinity College Dublin has a limited collection, despite its legal deposit status. The censorship laws of Ireland are such that the library can only acquire pornographic works with permission from the Minister for Justice, and the express permission of the Head Librarian is needed to access the material. There is also the specialist research collection of the Kinsey Institute; the institute's founder Alfred Kinsey, began collecting research material into sexual behaviour, including works of erotica, in 1938. The German National Library at Leipzig segregated works deemed salacious or morally improper from its founding in 1912. The writer Egon Kisch described the collection in 1925 as die Giftschränke (the poison cabinets). The segregation of works has now been mostly lifted, although it continues only for explicitly illegal material, such as child pornography, Holocaust denial or serious copyright infringement.

There is dispute on whether the Bibliotheca Apostolica Vaticana also holds an extensive pornography or erotica collection. Although the figures of 25,000 volumes and 100,000 prints and drawings have been put forward, Legman describes this as a "legend" and the historian H. Paul Jeffers calls it "a persistent and false belief".

== Notes and references ==
=== Sources ===
==== Books ====
- Attar, Karen (2016). Directory of Rare Book and Special Collections in the UK and Republic of Ireland. London: Facet Publishing. ISBN 978-1-7833-0016-7.
- Burns Bright, Jennifer; Crowley, Ronan (2014). "'A Quantity of Offensive Matter': Private Cases in Public Places". In Dean, Tim; Ruszczycky, Steven; Squires, David (eds.). Porn Archives. Durham, NC: Duke University Press. pp. 103–126. doi:10.1515/9780822376620-007. ISBN 978-0-8223-7662-0. S2CID 240890745.
- Colligan, Colette (2017). "The Making of the Enfer Bibliography. Guillaume Apollinaire, Eroto-Bibliography and the Enfer Collection". In Mudge, Bradford K. (ed.). The Cambridge Companion to Erotic Literature. Cambridge: Cambridge University Press. pp. 193–209. doi:10.1017/9781316875117. ISBN 978-1-3168-7511-7.
- Cross, Paul (1991). "The Private Case: A History". In Harris, P. R. (ed.). The Library of the British Museum: Retrospective Essays on the Department of Printed Books. London: The British Library. pp. 201–240. ISBN 978-0-7123-0242-5.
- Frayser, Suzanne G.; Whitby, Thomas Joseph (1995). Studies in Human Sexuality: A Selected Guide. Englewood, CO: Libraries Unlimited. ISBN 978-1-56308-131-6.
- Fryer, Peter (1966). Private Case—Public Scandal: Secrets of the British Museum Revealed. London: Secker and Warburg. OCLC 314927730.
- Ginzburg, Ralph (1958). An Unhurried View of Erotica. New York: Helmsman Press. OCLC 846468.
- Harris, R. F. (1998). A History of the British Museum Library, 1753–1973. London: The British Library. ISBN 978-0-7123-4562-0.
- Jeffers, H. Paul (2010). Dark Mysteries of The Vatican. New York: Kensington Publishing Corp. ISBN 978-0-8065-3376-6.
- Kearney, Patrick J. (1981). The Private Case: An Annotated Bibliography of the Private Case Erotica Collection in the British (Museum) Library. London: Jay Landesman. ISBN 978-0-9051-5024-6.
- Kearney, Patrick J. (1982). A History of Erotic Literature. London: Macmillan. ISBN 978-0-3333-4126-1.
- Kisch, Egon Erwin (1926). Hetzjagd durch die Zeit (in German). Berlin: Erich Reiss. OCLC 219699981.
- Legman, Gershon (1981). Introduction. The Private Case: An Annotated Bibliography of the Private Case Erotica Collection in the British (Museum) Library. By Kearney, Patrick. London: Jay Landesman. pp. 11–59. ISBN 978-0-9051-5024-6.
- Legman, Gershon (1991). "The Lure of the Forbidden". In Cornog, Martha (ed.). Libraries, Erotica, Pornography. Phoenix, Arizona: Oryx Press. pp. 36–68. ISBN 978-0-8977-4474-4.
- Nicholson, Geoff (2006). Sex Collectors. New York: Simon & Schuster. ISBN 978-0-7432-6587-4.
- Panek, Aneta (2022). Alchemy of Punk: Transmutation, Subversion, and Poetry in Punk Avant-Gardes. Berlin: Logos Verlag Berlin. ISBN 978-3-8325-5568-9.
- Peakman, Julie (2003). Mighty Lewd Books: The Development of Pornography in Eighteenth-Century England. Basingstoke, Hampshire: Palgrave Macmillan. ISBN 978-1-4039-1500-9.
- Pease, Allison (2000). Modernism, Mass Culture and the Aesthetics of Obscenity. Cambridge: Cambridge University Press. ISBN 978-0-5217-8076-6.
- Pershing, Gwendolyn (1991). "Erotica Research Collections". In Cornog, Martha (ed.). Libraries, Erotica, Pornography. Phoenix, AZ: Oryx Press. pp. 188–198. ISBN 978-0-8977-4474-4.
- Watson, Brian M. (2020). "Hellfire and Cannibals: Eighteenth- and Nineteenth-Century Erotic Reading Groups and Their Manuscripts". In Rose, Jonathan (ed.). The Edinburgh History of Reading: Subversive Readers. Edinburgh: Edinburgh University Press. pp. 75–96. ISBN 978-1-4744-6191-7.
- White, Barbara (2001). "1688–1880 (the United Kingdom, Including Scotland From 1707)". In Jones, Derek (ed.). Censorship: a World Encyclopedia. London: Fitzroy Dearborn Publishers. pp. 309–313. ISBN 978-1-5795-8135-0.

==== Journals and magazines ====
- Chambers, David (2015). "Ashbee, Henry Spencer [pseud. Pisanus Fraxi]". Oxford Dictionary of National Biography (online ed.). Oxford University Press. doi:10.1093/ref:odnb/737. (Subscription, Wikipedia Library access or UK public library membership required.)
- De Rycker, Kate (June 2015). "Translating the Ragionamento: Reframing Pietro Aretino as the Castigator of Courtesans: Translating Aretino's 'Lives of Whores'". Literature Compass. 12 (6): 299–309. doi:10.1111/lic3.12233.
- Edwards, A. S. G. (Winter 1983). "The Private Case Laid Bare". The Book Collector. 32 (4): 439–448. OCLC 822838929.
- Gaimster, David (September 2000). "Sex and Sensibility at the British Museum". History Today. 50 (9): 10–15.
- Houston, Lloyd (2015). "Towards a History of the Phi Collection, 1882–1945". Bodleian Library Record. 28 (2). Bodleian Library: 179–194. doi:10.3828/blr.2015.28.2.179. ISSN 0067-9488.
- Gaimster, David (2022). "Witt, George (1804–1869)". Oxford Dictionary of National Biography (online ed.). Oxford University Press. doi:10.1093/ref:odnb/74100. (Subscription, Wikipedia Library access or UK public library membership required.)
- Gauld, Alan (2004). "Dingwall, Eric John (1891?–1986)". Oxford Dictionary of National Biography (online ed.). Oxford University Press. doi:10.1093/ref:odnb/40749. (Subscription, Wikipedia Library access or UK public library membership required.)
- Harrison, Brian (2006). "Walter". Oxford Dictionary of National Biography (online ed.). Oxford University Press. doi:10.1093/ref:odnb/74203. (Subscription, Wikipedia Library access or UK public library membership required.)
- Haynes, E. S. P. (December 1913). "The Taboos of the British Museum Library". The English Review: 123–134.
- Moore, Alison (March 2012). "Arcane Erotica and National 'Patrimony': Britain's Private Case and the Collection de l'Enfer of the Bibliothèque Nationale de France". Cultural Studies Review. 18 (1): 196–216. ISSN 1837-8692.
- Schuster, Mark (3 October 1979). "Library houses pornography from A to Zeta". Yale Daily News. p. 7.
- Sims, Liam (2015). "'Scandalous and Libellous Books': The Arc Collection at Cambridge University Library". Transactions of the Cambridge Bibliographical Society. 15 (4): 625–645. ISSN 0068-6611. JSTOR 24900130.
- Thomas, Jeffrey F. (12 October 1957). "Yale's Zeta Shelves: Fanny Hill and Emily Post". Yale Daily News. p. 7.
- Wickstead, Helen (2 April 2020). "Soho Typescripts: Handmade Obscene Books in Post-War London Bookshops" (PDF). Porn Studies. 7 (2): 187–211. doi:10.1080/23268743.2019.1689842. S2CID 213622992.

==== Websites ====
- "About the Agency for the Legal Deposit Libraries". Legal Deposit Libraries. Archived from the original on 15 November 2022.
- "Ashbee Library". The British Library. Archived from the original on 26 March 2023.
- "Collection Guides: Private Case". The British Library. Archived from the original on 18 March 2023.
- Edwards, Adrian (19 February 2019). "The Dawes Bequest of Erotica: so Sensitive, it had to be Smuggled in at Dawn". The British Library. Archived from the original on 18 March 2023.
- "Gale Unlocks Restricted Collections with Archives of Sexuality & Gender, Part III". Cengage Group. 4 February 2019. Archived from the original on 31 March 2023.
- Goldfinch, John (7 September 2020). "Erotic, Gallant and Libertine Books from the Collection of Henry Spencer Ashbee". The British Library. Archived from the original on 25 March 2023.
- "History of the British Library". The British Library. Archived from the original on 30 July 2018.
- "History of the British Museum". The British Museum. Archived from the original on 15 March 2023.
- "Legal Deposit". The British Library. Archived from the original on 19 March 2023.
- "Legal Deposit—The Library of Trinity College Dublin". Trinity College Dublin. 25 November 2021. Archived from the original on 26 March 2023.
- Lochlainn, Caoimhe Ni (6 April 2023). "Legal deposit libraries of Ireland and the UK celebrate 10th anniversary of digital collecting". Trinity College Dublin. Archived from the original on 20 April 2023.
- Räuber, Jörg (28 August 2023). "Die Giftschränke der Deutschen Bücherei". Deutsche Nationalbibliothek (in German).

==== Newspapers ====
- Barrell, Tony (30 August 2009). "Rude Britannia: Erotic Secrets of the British Museum". The Sunday Times. Archived from the original on 15 June 2011.
- Flood, Alison (4 February 2019). "British Library's Collection of Obscene Writing Goes Online". The Guardian. Archived from the original on 4 July 2022.
- Gardner, Jessica (1 May 2018). "The Mysterious Cambridge Library Tower Opens to the Public". The Independent. Archived from the original on 22 December 2022.
