= British National Bibliography =

National bibliography

The British National Bibliography (BNB) was established at the British Museum in 1949 to publish a list of the books, journals and serials that are published in the United Kingdom and Republic of Ireland. It also includes information on forthcoming titles. This is the single most comprehensive listing of UK titles. UK and Irish publishers are obliged by legal deposit to send a copy of all new publications, including serial titles, to the BNB for listing. The BNB publishes the list weekly in electronic form: the last printed weekly list appeared in December 2011.

The bibliography was first published in 1950, by the Council of the British National Bibliography under the editorship of A.J (Jack) Wells. Initial production was from a bomb-damaged building at 39 Russell Square. In 1964 a move was made to 7 Bedford Square together with office space in Ridgmount Street. In 1967 the office moved to 7/9 Rathbone Street. From 1974 BNB became part of and published by the Bibliographic Services Division of the British Library with a further office move to 14 Store Street adjacent to the Library Association (later CILIP)'s Ridgmount Street offices. In 1981 production was transferred to Novello House on the corner of Wardour Street and Sheraton Street (adjacent to the British Library's then Central Administration offices), and in 1992 from London to the British Library's northern site on the Thorp Arch Trading Estate near to Boston Spa where it became the National Bibliographic Service.

As a printed publication it was a subject catalogue accompanied by various indexes. The weekly issues were cumulated during each year and then into an annual volume. Some of the cumulations were for three year periods and as the volume of entries increased the indexes became separate volumes. The entries were based on printed publications received at the copyright receipt office of the British Library (of the British Museum before 1973). Certain printed materials were excluded: periodical publications (except the first issue of each), printed maps, music (covered from 1957 by the British Catalogue of Music), and some government publications. However publications of publishers in the United Kingdom and the Republic of Ireland were included as these were subject to the copyright deposit law. The BNB operated a catalogue card service to libraries which was used by many public and other libraries.

BNB's first intake was classified using the (then current) 14th edition of the Dewey Decimal Classification (DDC) but it was considered to be inadequate in specificity, currency and consistency to express the range of subjects to be found in the year's expected intake of around 15,000 items. The editor A. J. Wells was an adherent of S. R. Ranganathan's theories of faceted classification and in 1951 BNB applied Ranganathan's technique of chain indexing as well as adding additional symbols to the basic DDC decimal number. The colon and slash were borrowed from the Universal Decimal Classification and a suffixed [1] (assigned a filing value between zero and one) was used to extend the specificity of more general DDC numbers by adding faceted text extensions following Ranganathan's PMEST (Personality / Matter / Energy / Space / Time) order. When the much reduced and partly restructured 15th edition of DDC was published in 1951 BNB continued to use its own extended DDC 14 while adopting some new numbers that covered emerging concepts. Similarly, on the publication of the 16th edition of DDC in 1958 BNB incorporated new numbers that provided useful extensions to those in its own extended schedule of DDC 14. In 1960 BNB refined its faceted extensions to DDC 14 numbers through the use of suffixed lower case alphabetic characters to represent common subdivisions and extensions. These were published as Supplementary Classification Schedules in 1963. The 17th edition of DDC was published in 1965 but BNB again announced that it would not adopt it; a conversion table from its own 'unofficial' Dewey to DDC 17 was however produced in 1968. In January 1971 BNB abandoned its 'unofficial' schedule and adopted the 18th edition of DDC, and it has followed new editions since that time.

A principal reason for deciding to adopt DDC 18 was the discovery that the sometimes manually adapted chain indexing, which depended on the structured unofficial schedule of DDC 14 could not be reliably computerized. From January 1974, BNB adopted a new indexing system: PRECIS (PREserved Context Indexing System) which was developed by Derek Austin out of research by the Classification Research Group into the theoretical basis for a new general classification scheme. Initial subject analysis by PRECIS indexers formed the basis of the entire subject package comprising index entries and references, DDC numbers, Library of Congress Classification numbers and Library of Congress Subject Headings.

== See also ==
- Agency for the Legal Deposit Libraries
- National Bibliography Number (NBN)
- Books in the United Kingdom
