= Legal Deposit Libraries Act 2003 =

Act of the Parliament of the United Kingdom

Legal Deposit Libraries Act 2003 (Note: Section 17.)
- Act of Parliament
- Parliament of the United Kingdom
- Long title: An Act to make provision in place of section 15 of the Copyright Act 1911 relating to the deposit of printed and similar publications, including on and off line publications; to make provision about the use and preservation of material deposited; and for connected purposes.
- Citation: 2003 c. 28
- Introduced by: Chris Mole (private member's bill) (Commons)
- Territorial extent: United Kingdom (Note: Section 16(5).)

Dates
- Royal assent: 30 October 2003
- Commencement: 1 February 2004 (Note: The Deposit Libraries Act 2003 (Commencement) Order 2004.)
Other legislation
Amends	Copyright Act 1911; National Library of Scotland Act 1925; British Library Act 1972; Copyright, Designs and Patents Act 1988; Copyright and Rights in Databases Regulations 1997
Repeals/revokes	British Museum Act 1932
Amended by	Coroners and Justice Act 2009; Criminal Justice and Licensing (Scotland) Act 2010; National Library of Scotland Act 2012

Status: Amended

Text of statute as originally enacted

Revised text of statute as amended

The Legal Deposit Libraries Act 2003 (c. 28) is an act of the Parliament of the United Kingdom which regulates the legal deposit of publications in the United Kingdom. The bill for this act was a private member's bill. This act was passed to update the legislation on legal deposit to reflect the digital age.

The act was passed as a private member's bill.

== Legislative background ==
The previous provisions covering legal deposit in the United Kingdom were under the Copyright Act 1911 (1 & 2 Geo. 5. c. 46). They covered published paper products of almost all types, excluding only ephemera such as diaries and bus timetables. By the beginning of the 21st century many publications appeared in electronic form, either exclusively or in addition to their print form. A voluntary set of rules for deposit had been drawn up a few years earlier but it was felt that the additional force of statute was required to ensure the British national published record remained complete.

== Legal deposit process under the Legal Deposit Libraries Act 2003 ==
As under the previous legislation there are six libraries entitled to printed works. The British Library is entitled to a copy of every printed work published in the United Kingdom. A publisher must send a copy to the British Library within a month of the work being published. The copy sent to the British Library must be of the same quality as the best copies published in the UK at the time.

The other five libraries, the Bodleian Library, the Cambridge University Library, the Library of Trinity College, Dublin, the National Library of Wales and the National Library of Scotland are not automatically entitled to be sent a copy of the printed works. However, the five libraries have the right to send a publisher a request for a printed work within twelve months of the publication of the work. The publisher must deliver a copy within a month of receipt of the request. The quality of works sent to any of the five libraries must be of the same quality as the largest number of copies of the work published in the UK at the time of the request. Trinity College Dublin is included in the act despite it being outside the UK's jurisdiction, as the act continued the more ancient right bestowed on the college in 1801, when Ireland was part of the Union.

Each of these five libraries sends requests via the Agency for the Legal Deposit Libraries, who receives copies of the works and distributes them to the individual libraries. Publishers may also send copies to the Agency in advance of a request being submitted to them.

== Non-print publications ==
The 2003 act includes provisions for the deposit of non-print publications such as CD-ROMs and copies of websites. The Secretary of State is given powers to make regulations governing the deposit of non-print publications. The regulations are permitted to include such things as provisions determining how and when a non-print publication must be deposited; when an online work is considered to be published in the UK and therefore subject to the 2003 act; the quality and means of delivery of the copy of the work; the format that the deposited copy must be presented in where different formats of the work exist; an obligation to give the deposit library information to make the work accessible and the timing when deposit must be made. There are also restrictions put in place as to the activities that may be undertaken with the non-print publications, unless those activities are authorised by regulations made by the Secretary of State. Those restrictions include copying the material, adapting a computer program or database, lending the material, transferring the material to a third party or disposing of the material. Even the using of the material is prohibited subject to regulations stating otherwise. The power to make regulations restricting various matters, including when non-print publications may be used, which readers may use the material and how many people may use a non-print publication at once is also provided for. The 2003 act also contains provisions that prevent regulations meaning publishers must deposit non-print publications at Trinity College, Dublin unless Irish law on copyright and related rights contains equivalent protections to British copyright law, that the restrictions on the acts that may be done with non-print publications are equivalent to British law and that the liability exceptions in Irish law are equivalent to those in British law.

== Exceptions ==
The 2003 act also inserted various exceptions to copyright and database right into the Copyright, Designs and Patents Act 1988 and the Copyright and Rights in Databases Regulations 1997 to prevent the use of non-print publications by deposit libraries infringing copyright and/or database rights. However, the 2003 act enabled regulations to be made restricting the exceptions to copyright for non-print publications so that deposited works may not be copied more freely than an equivalent work available at an ordinary library. Various exemptions from liability against breach of contract; infringement of copyright, database right or publication right; criminal liability or damages for defamation were also enacted by the 2003 act to protect deposit libraries using works and publishers sending works to deposit libraries from actions for breach of those liabilities that could otherwise occur.

== Commencement and extent ==
Section 16 of the 2003 act and the power to make regulations came into force upon royal assent of the 2003 act. The rest of the act was brought into force on 1 February 2004 by article 2 of the Legal Deposit Libraries Act 2003 (Commencement) Order 2004 (SI 2004/130) (C 5). The 2003 act extends to the whole of the United Kingdom.

== See also ==
- Books in the United Kingdom
- List of libraries in the United Kingdom
- Halsbury's Statutes
