= Alfred Place =

Street in Bloomsbury, London

Coordinates: 51.5200°N 0.1327°W

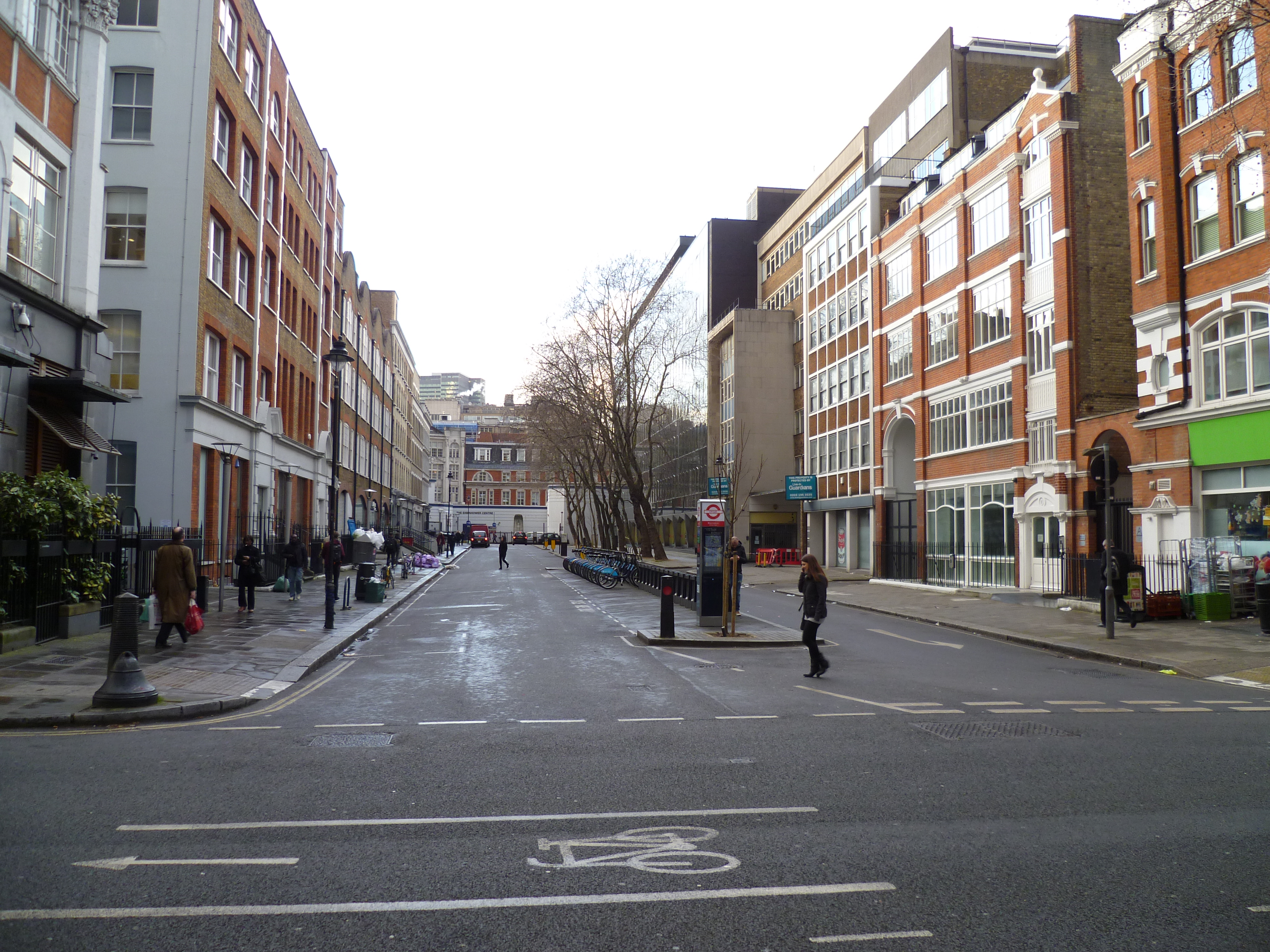
One Alfred Place.

Alfred Place is a street in Bloomsbury, London, running between Chenies Street and Store Street.

== Location ==
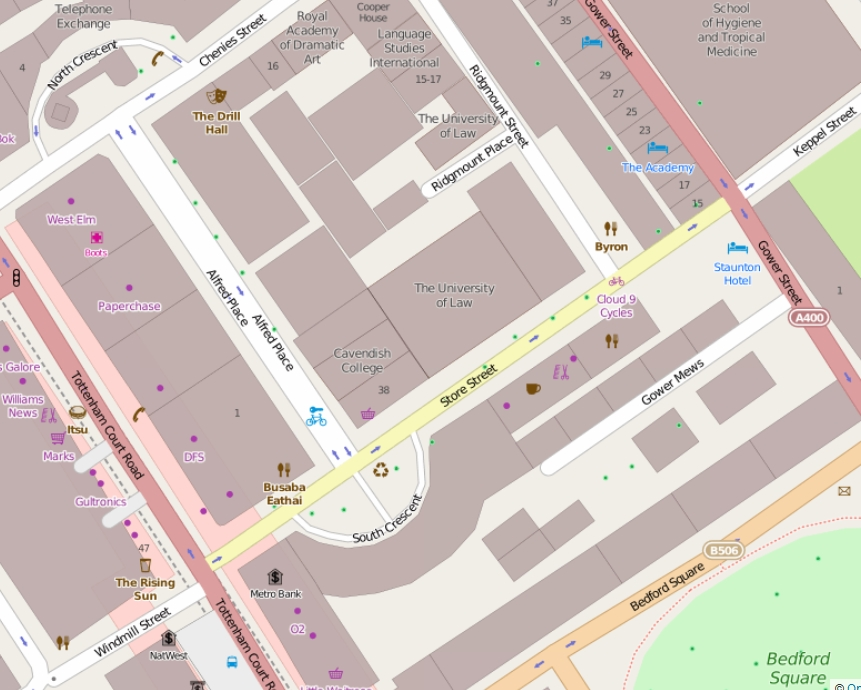
The immediate vicinity of Alfred Place.

Alfred Place runs from Chenies Street in the north to Store Street in the south. It runs parallel with Ridgmount Street and Tottenham Court Road.

There is a cycle hire point at the south end of the street.

== Buildings ==
The street is home to:

- The Residential Property Tribunal for the London area at number 10.
- Whittington House, on the north east corner with Chenies Street, designed by architect Richard Seifert who also designed nearby Centre Point in New Oxford Street. According to Ruth Siddall of University College London, the building is "faced with close-fitted, highly polished, black Rustenburg Bon Accord Gabbro from the Bushveld lopolith in the Transvaal, South Africa .... composed of interlocking crystals of white feldspar and black pyroxene."

== Inhabitants ==
The poet Thomas Campbell (1777–1844) lived in Alfred Place in 1837.

Irish dramatist, James Sheridan Knowles (1784–1862), lived at number 29.
