= National Central Library (England and Wales) =

Scholarly library in twentieth-century London

Coordinates: 51.5200°N 0.1315°W

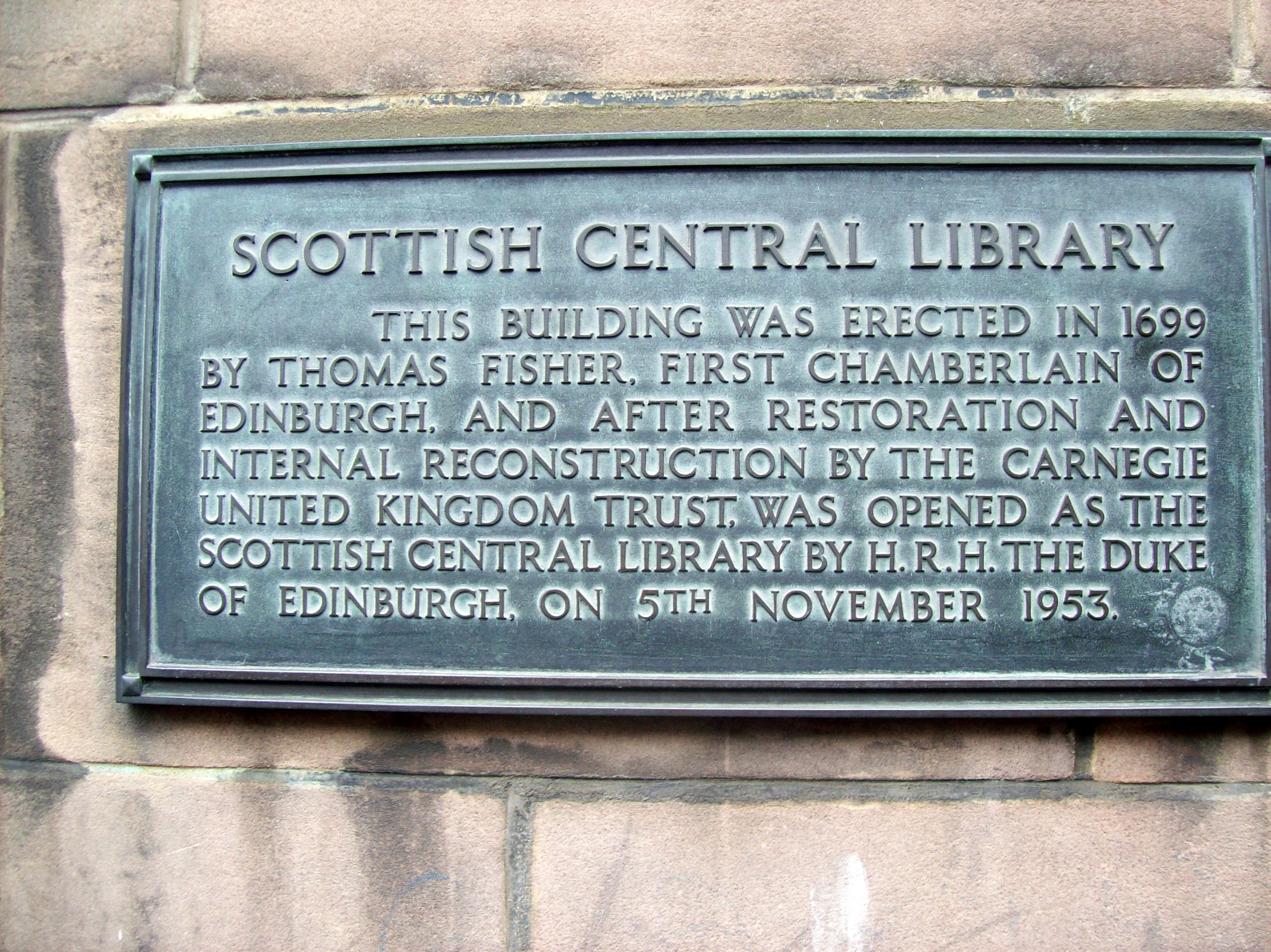
The Scottish Central Library, Edinburgh

The National Central Library was a library at 14 Store Street, London W.C.1, in the 20th century. It was a tutorial system and a scholarly library for working people who were not connected to an academic institution. The founder of the library was Albert Mansbridge.

The library was founded in 1916 as the Central Library for Students, and in 1966 moved from Malet Place to a new building in Store Street, near the British Museum Library. In 1971-73 the librarian and secretary to the trustees was Maurice Line. The library was incorporated by royal charter and maintained by annual grants from the Department of Education and Science, local authorities, university and special libraries, adult education bodies and public trusts. The library was the national centre for the inter-lending of books (other than fiction and students' textbooks) and periodicals to readers in all parts of the British Isles through the libraries to which they belonged. Inter-lending was also carried on to and from foreign libraries through their national centres. Other tasks it undertook were the establishment of a union catalogue of Slavonic books and periodicals in British libraries and the production of the British Union Catalogue of Periodicals. On the establishment of the British Library in 1973 the National Central Library was incorporated with it.

The Scottish Central Library in Edinburgh carried out in Scotland functions similar to those of the National Central Library. In 1972 its stock was 40,000 volumes. There was also the Scottish Library for Students in Dunfermline.
