= Ridgmount Street =

Street in Bloomsbury, London, England

Coordinates: 51°31′14.03″N 0°7′53.14″W

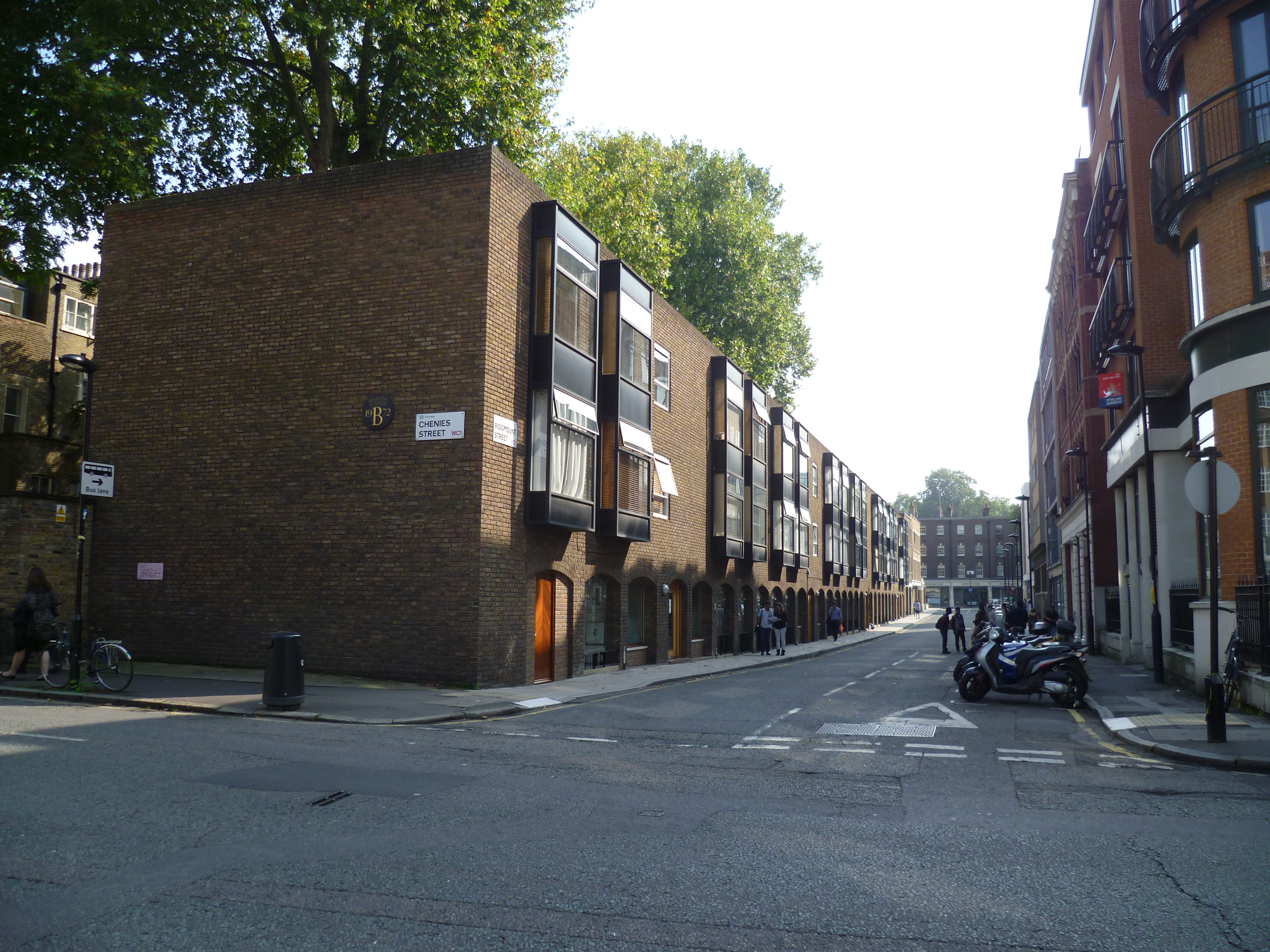
Looking down Ridgmount Street from Chenies Street.

Ridgmount Street is a street in Bloomsbury, London.

== Location ==
Ridgmount Street runs from Chenies Street in the north to Store Street in the south. It runs parallel with Gower Street and Alfred Place. Ridgmount Place joins Ridgmount Street on its western side.

== Occupants and buildings ==
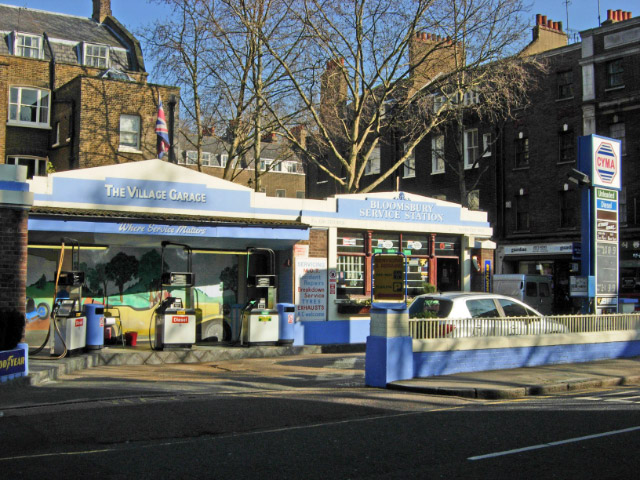
The former Bloomsbury Service Station.

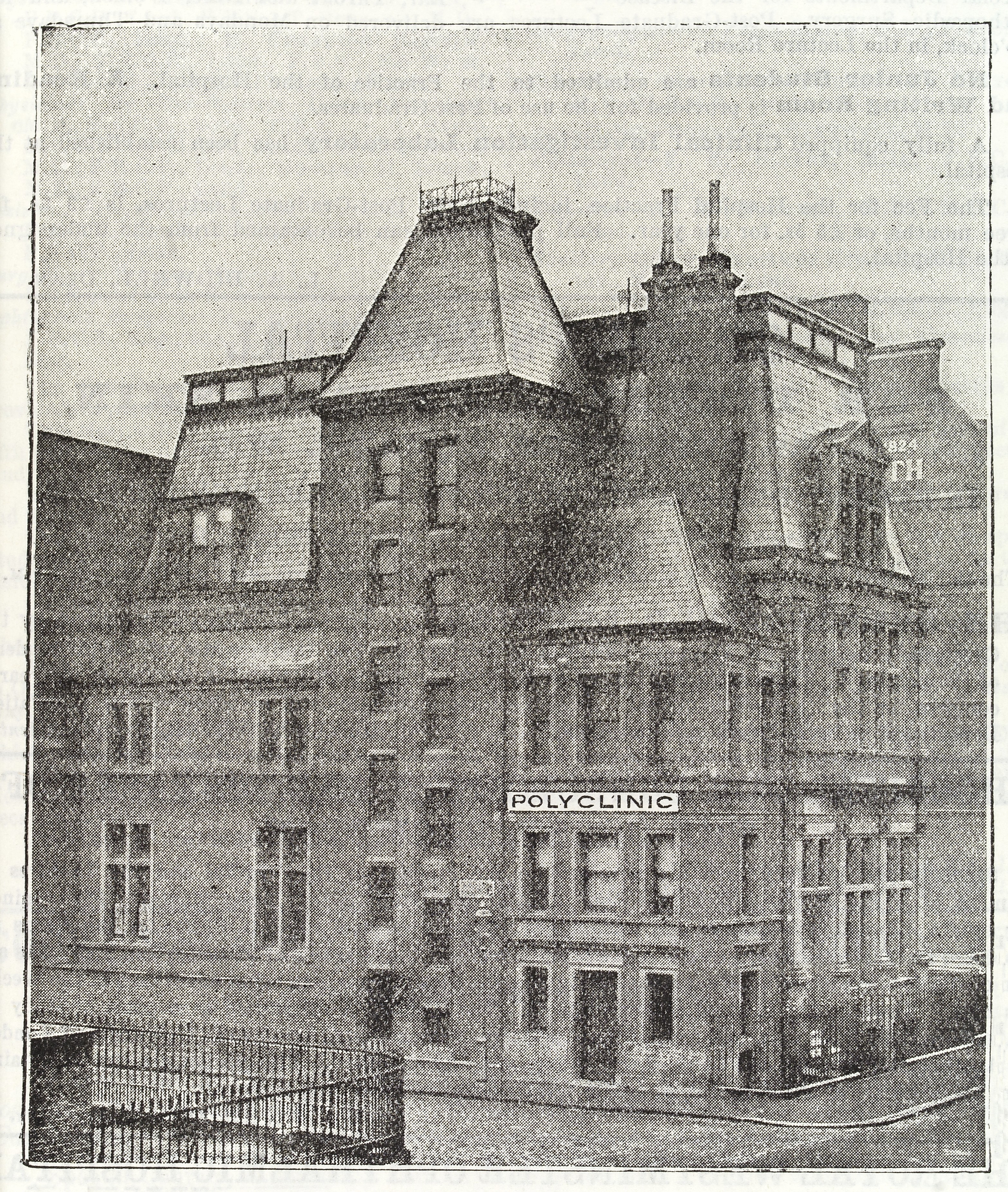
The Polyclinic (since demolished)

The street is home to:

- Institute for Fiscal Studies at number 7.
- The Child and Family Practice at number 8.
- The former Bloomsbury Petrol Station at the south end of the street was the subject of an award-winning redevelopment.

The street was also previously home to the Chartered Institute of Library and Information Professionals (CILIP) at number 7; the building was purpose-built in 1965 as the headquarters of the Library Association, one of CILIP's predecessors. CILIP sold their Ridgmount Street headquarters in 2023, and re-located to offices at the British Library.

== The Polyclinic ==
At number 22 Chenies Street, on the north western corner of Ridgmount Street, once stood the Medical Graduates' College and Polyclinic. It has since been replaced by Nicholas Cooper House, owned by the Royal Academy of Dramatic Art. The Polyclinic was the first British postgraduate medical institution.
