= Store Street, London =

Street in Bloomsbury, London, England

Coordinates: 51°31′11.45″N 0°7′53.41″W

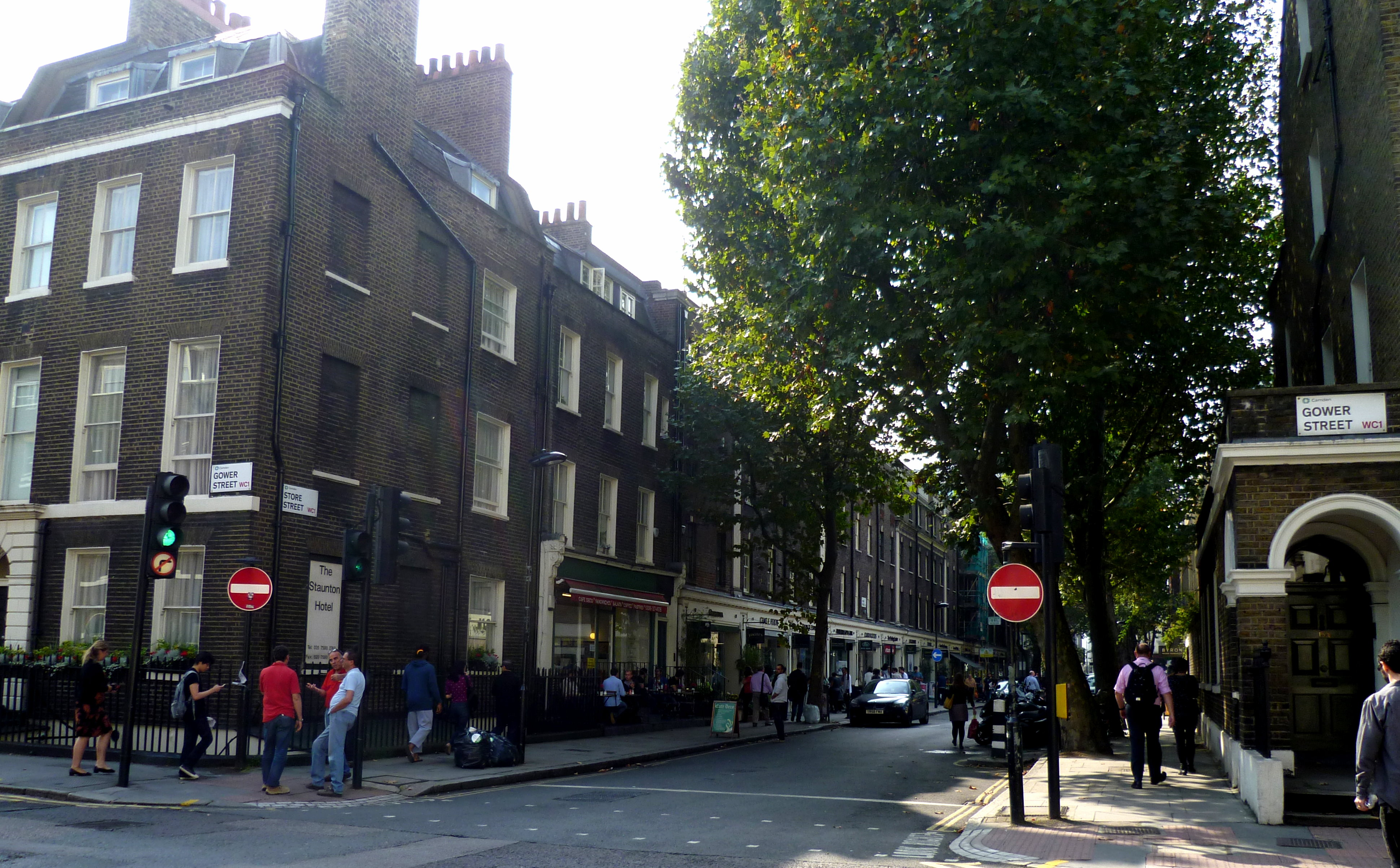
The eastern end of Store Street, seen from Gower Street

Store Street is a street in Bloomsbury, London.

== Location ==
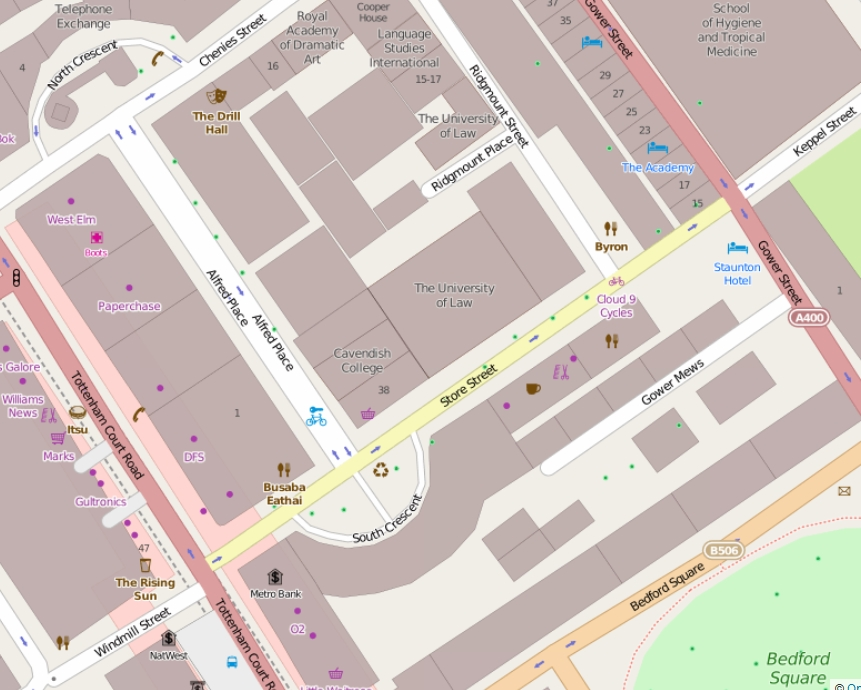
The immediate vicinity of Store Street

Store Street runs between Gower Street and Tottenham Court Road. It is joined by Ridgmount Street on its north side. Store Street runs parallel with Chenies Street and Alfred Place joins the two. South Crescent is on the south side of Store Street which mirrors North Crescent on the north side of Chenies Street.

== Buildings ==
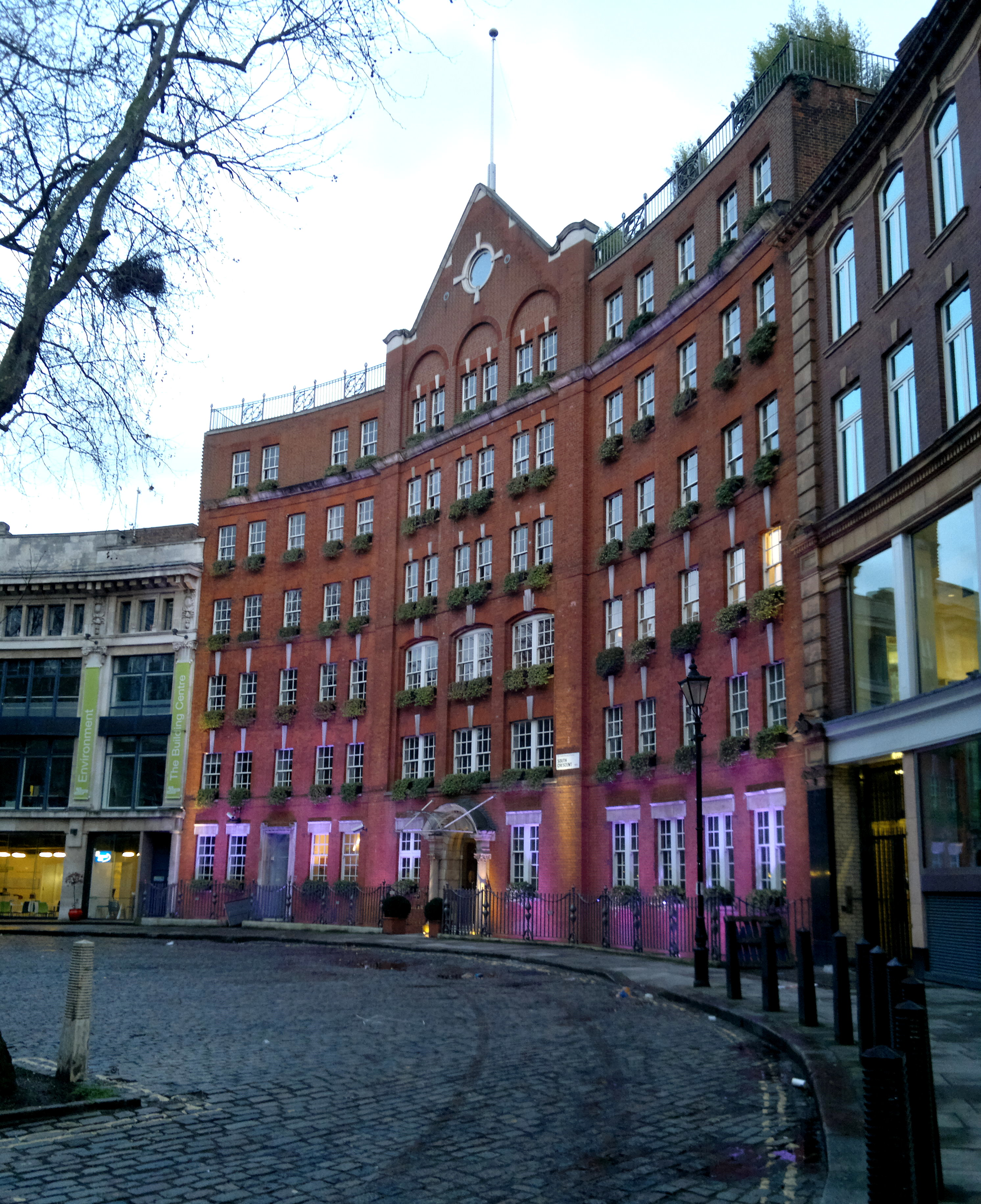
South Crescent

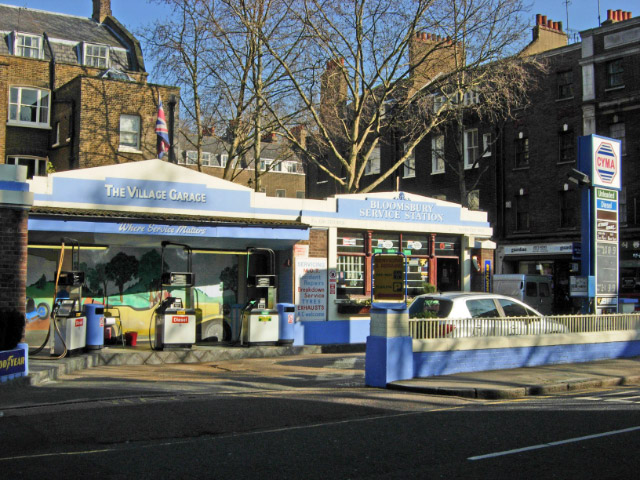
The former Bloomsbury Service Station

The street is made up mainly of offices with a parade of small shops on the south side between the eastern end of South Crescent and Gower Street. It also houses The University of Law's London Bloomsbury campus.

The Building Centre has been at 26 Store Street since the 1950s and is the hub for the built environment. It houses a cafe, exhibitions, events and materials and product galleries. It's a public space and part of the Mayor of London's shaded spaces initiative.

The former Bloomsbury Petrol Station on the corner of Ridgmount Street was subject to an award-winning redevelopment.

The Store Street Music Hall was once located at number 16.

== Inhabitants ==
Mary Wollstonecraft (1759–1797) lived in Store Street in 1791 while writing her pioneering A Vindication of the Rights of Woman (1792).

Thomas King (1730–1805), actor and theatrical impresario, died at his home in New Store Street in 1805.

Dr. Crippen lived at 34–37 Store St before moving to 39 Hilldrop Crescent where he murdered his wife.
