= Agency for the Legal Deposit Libraries =

British government agency

- Location: 21 Marnin Way, Edinburgh, EH12 9GD, Ireland and the United Kingdom
- Type: Legal deposit agency
- Reference to legal mandate: Legal Deposit Libraries Act 2003 and Copyright and Related Rights Act 2000

Collection
- Legal deposit: Ireland and the United Kingdom

Other information
- Employees: Currently 8 employees
- Website: http://www.legaldeposit.org.uk

The Agency for the Legal Deposit Libraries (formerly known as the Copyright Libraries Agency) acts as on behalf of five of the legal deposit libraries defined in both the law of Ireland and the United Kingdom to obtain copies of material published and distributed in those countries.

The current agency came into existence on 2 March 2009. It replaced a previous agency of the same name which was based at 100 Euston Street, London. In January 2019 it moved from 161 Causewayside to 21 Marnin Way, Edinburgh, EH12 9GD.

The Agency acts on behalf of the Bodleian Library, the Cambridge University Library, the Library of Trinity College, Dublin, the National Library of Wales and the National Library of Scotland. These five libraries, designated as legal deposit libraries under the Legal Deposit Libraries Act 2003 and Copyright and Related Rights Act 2000, are entitled to request a free copy of any material published in either the United Kingdom or Ireland within twelve months of its publication.

The Agency submits requests to publishers on behalf of the libraries. Publishers are then responsible for sending copies of materials directly to the five individual libraries, or to the Agency, for redistribution. Many publishers submit copies of works to the Agency in advance of receiving a request. Libraries may also submit requests directly to publishers. Formerly, the Agency's British office for receipt of material was located in London and was supported by Cambridge University, but constraints on space led to a need for relocation, and on 2 March 2009 the Agency officially moved to the National Library of Scotland in Edinburgh. Material originating in Ireland is forwarded via the Trinity College Library, Dublin, to Edinburgh.

The Agency does not act on behalf of the British Library, which has a special status under the Legal Deposit Libraries Act 2003 and Copyright and Related Rights Act 2000, meaning it is entitled to receive copies of published materials automatically, without needing to request them. The British Library maintains its own Legal Deposit Office to handle receipt of materials submitted to them. For similar reasons the Agency does not act for the National Library of Ireland, the library of the University of Limerick, the library of Dublin City University or the libraries of the National University of Ireland; however, these libraries are only automatically entitled to material published in Ireland.

== See also ==
- Books in the United Kingdom
- List of libraries in the Republic of Ireland
