= Frederick Barnard =

Frederick Barnard may refer to:

- Sir Frederick Augusta Barnard (1742–1830), George III's librarian
- Fred Barnard (1846–1896), Victorian illustrator
- Frederick A. P. Barnard (1809–1889), American scientist and educator
