= British Library =

National library of the United Kingdom

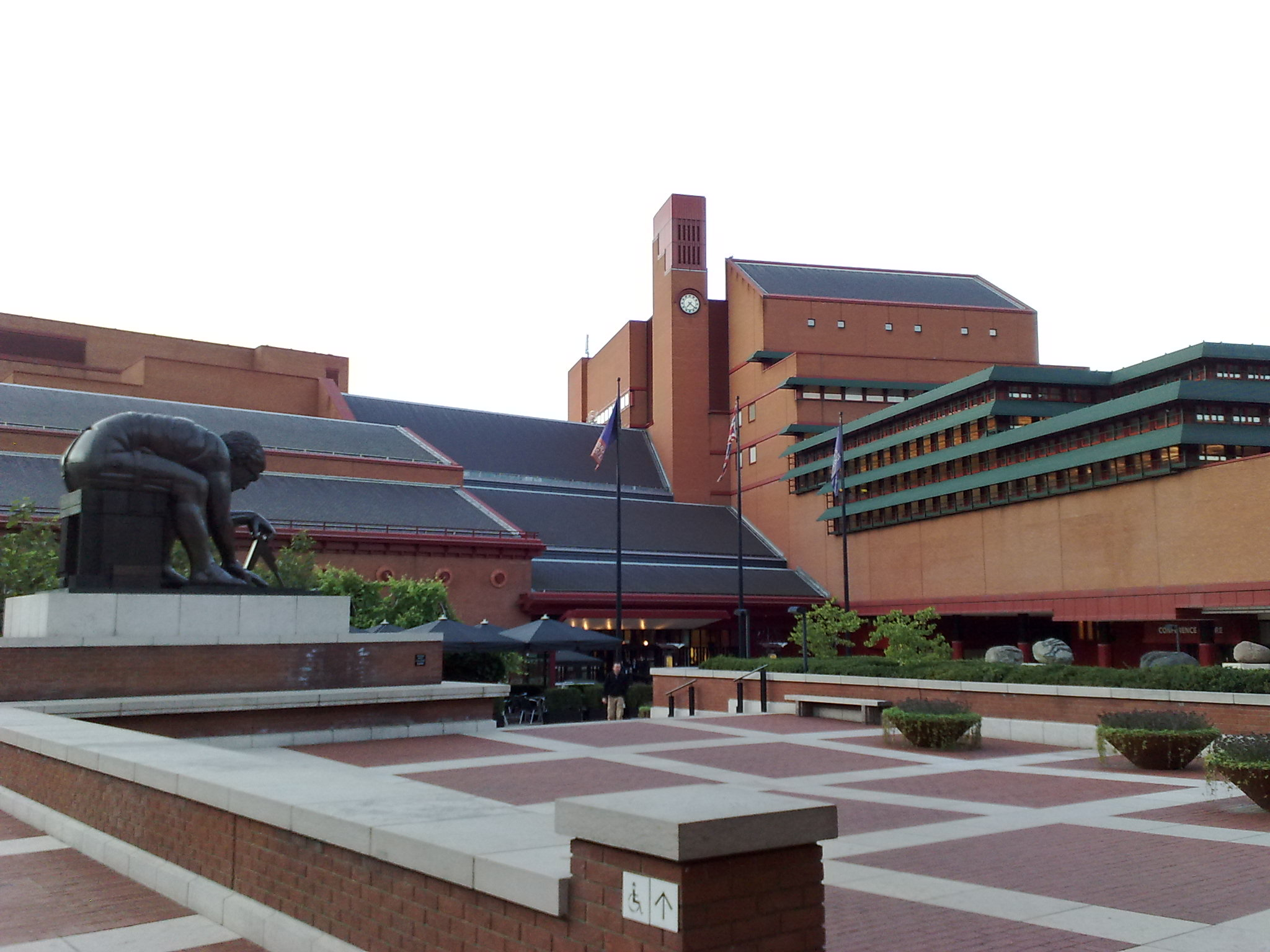
- The British Library from the piazza
- 51°31′46″N 0°07′37″W
- Location: 96 Euston Road; London, NW1 2DB, England
- Type: National library
- Established: 1 July 1973 (53 years ago)
- Architects: Colin St John Wilson; Mary Jane Long
- Branches: 1 (Boston Spa, West Yorkshire)

Collection
- Items collected: Books, journals, newspapers, magazines, sound and music recordings, patents, databases, maps, stamps, prints, drawings, and manuscripts
- Size: 200 million+ items: 13,950,000 books; 824,101 serial titles; 351,116 manuscripts (single and volumes); 8,266,276 philatelic items; 4,347,505 cartographic items; 1,607,885 music scores; 6,000,000 sound recordings
- Legal deposit: Yes, provided in law by: Legal Deposit Libraries Act 2003 (United Kingdom); Copyright and Related Rights Act, 2000 (Republic of Ireland)

Access and use
- Access requirements: Open to anyone with a need to use the collections and services

Other information
- Budget: £142 million
- Chair: Dame Carol Black
- Chief executive: Jeremy Silver
- Website: bl.uk

Listed Building – Grade I
- Official name: The British Library, piazza, boundary wall and railings to Ossulston Street, Euston Road and Midland Road
- Designated: 31 July 2015
- Reference no.: 1426345

The British Library is the national library of the United Kingdom. Based in London, it is one of the largest libraries in the world, with an estimated collection of over 200 million items from multiple countries. As a legal deposit library, it receives copies of all books produced in the United Kingdom and Ireland, as well as a significant proportion of overseas titles distributed in the United Kingdom. The library operates as a non-departmental public body sponsored by the Department for Digital, Culture, Media and Sport.

The British Library is a major research library, with items in many languages and in many formats, both print and digital: books, manuscripts, journals, newspapers, magazines, sound and music recordings, videos, play-scripts, patents, databases, maps, stamps, prints, and drawings. The Library's collections include around 14 million books, along with substantial holdings of manuscripts and items dating as far back as 2000 BC. The library maintains a programme for content acquisition and adds some three million items each year occupying 9.6 kilometres (6 mi) of new shelf space.

The Library's purpose-built building stands next to St Pancras station in London. It was officially opened by Elizabeth II on 25 June 1998, and is classified as a Grade I listed building "of exceptional interest" for its architecture and history. Off-site storage is provided at a second site near Boston Spa in Yorkshire.

== History ==
=== Early foundations (1972–1997) ===
The British Library was created on 1 July 1973 after the passing of the British Library Act 1972. Before this, the national library was part of the British Museum, which provided the bulk of the holdings of the new library, alongside smaller organisations which were folded in (such as the National Central Library, the National Lending Library for Science and Technology and the British National Bibliography). In 1974 functions previously exercised by the Office for Scientific and Technical Information were taken over; in 1982 the India Office Library and Records and the HMSO Binderies became British Library responsibilities. In 1983, the Library absorbed the National Sound Archive, which holds many sound and video recordings, with over a million discs and thousands of tapes.

The core of the Library's historical collections is based on donations and acquisitions from the 18th century known as the "foundation collections", and include the books and manuscripts of Sir Hans Sloane (d. 1753), whose decision to donate his library and natural history collection to the nation led to the formation of the British Museum. The museum trustees purchased the Harleian Library collection of Robert Harley (d. 1721) for £10,000; (Note: £10,000 in 1822 is approximately equivalent to £1,685,660 in 2025, according to calculations based on Consumer Price Index measure of inflation.) Also provided to the library was the Cotton library, the former collection of Sir Robert Cotton (d. 1631); this was in public possession and had been housed at Ashburnham House, Westminster. These collections were added to by the Old Royal Library, donated by George II, and the King's Library of George III.

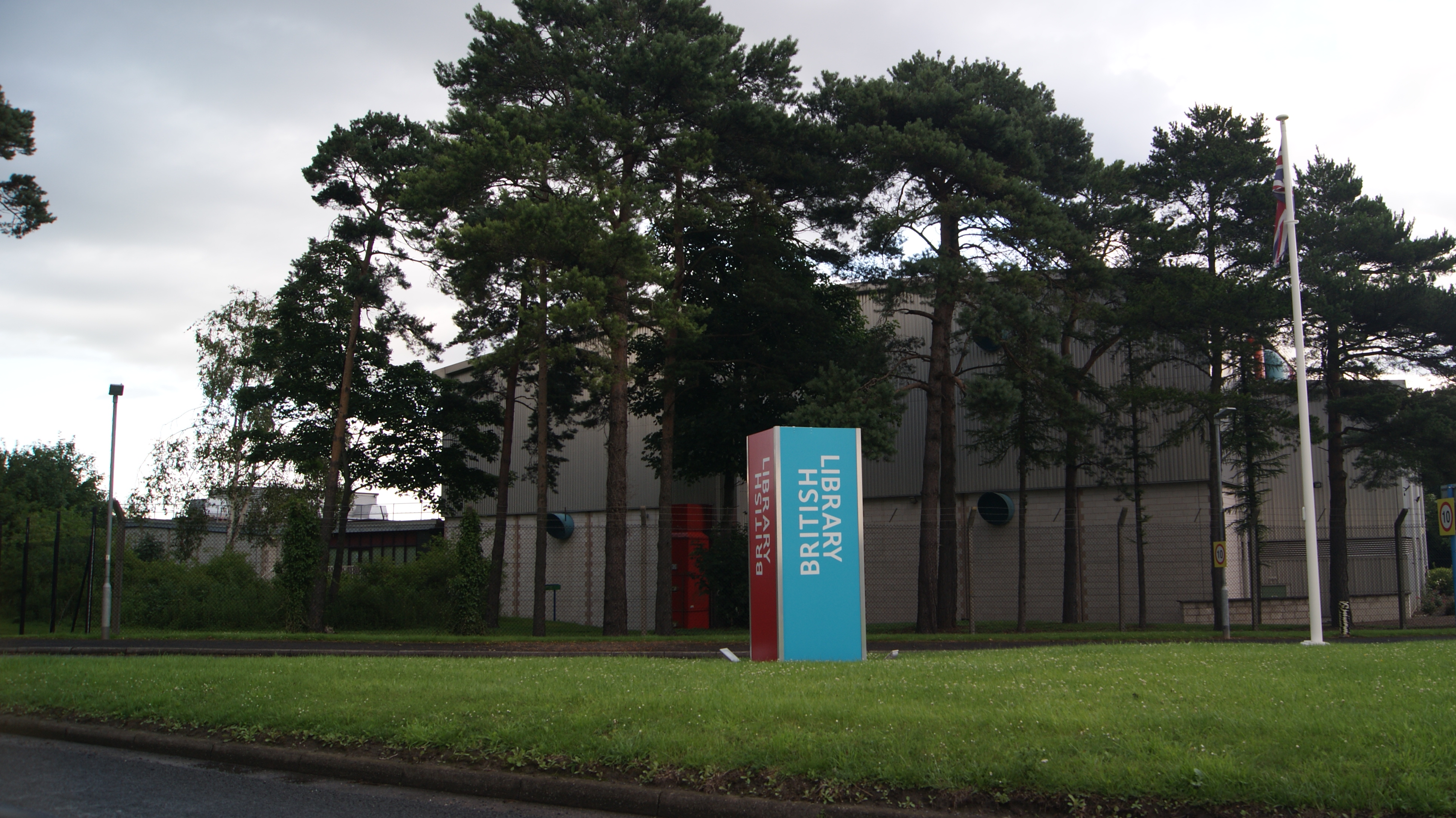
The British Library branch at Boston Spa (on Thorp Arch Trading Estate), West Yorkshire

For many years its collections were dispersed in various buildings around central London including Bloomsbury (within the British Museum), Chancery Lane, Bayswater, and Holborn, with an interlibrary lending centre on Thorp Arch Trading Estate near Boston Spa, 2.5 miles (4 km) east of Wetherby in West Yorkshire, and the newspaper library at Colindale, north-west London.

=== Move to St Pancras (1997–present) ===
Initial plans for the British Library required demolition of an integral part of Bloomsbury – a 7-acre (2.8 ha) swathe of streets immediately in front of the Museum, so that the Library could be situated directly opposite. After a long and hard-fought campaign led by George Wagner, this decision was overturned and the library was instead constructed by John Laing plc on a site at Euston Road next to St Pancras railway station.

Following the closure of the Round Reading Room on 25 October 1997 the library stock began to be moved into the St Pancras building. Before the end of that year the first of eleven new reading rooms had opened and the moving of stock was continuing. From 1997 to 2009 the main collection was housed in this single new building and the collection of British and overseas newspapers was housed at Colindale. In July 2008 the Library announced that it would move low-use items to a new Additional Storage Building near Boston Spa in Yorkshire and that it planned to close the newspaper library at Colindale, ahead of a later move to a similar facility on the same site. From January 2009 to April 2012 more than 200 km of material was moved to the Additional Storage Building and is delivered to British Library Reading Rooms in London on request by a daily shuttle service. Construction of the Additional Storage Building was completed in 2013 and the newspaper library at Colindale closed on 8 November 2013. The collection has now been split between the St Pancras and Boston Spa sites. The Library's book storage depot in Woolwich, south-east London is no longer in use.

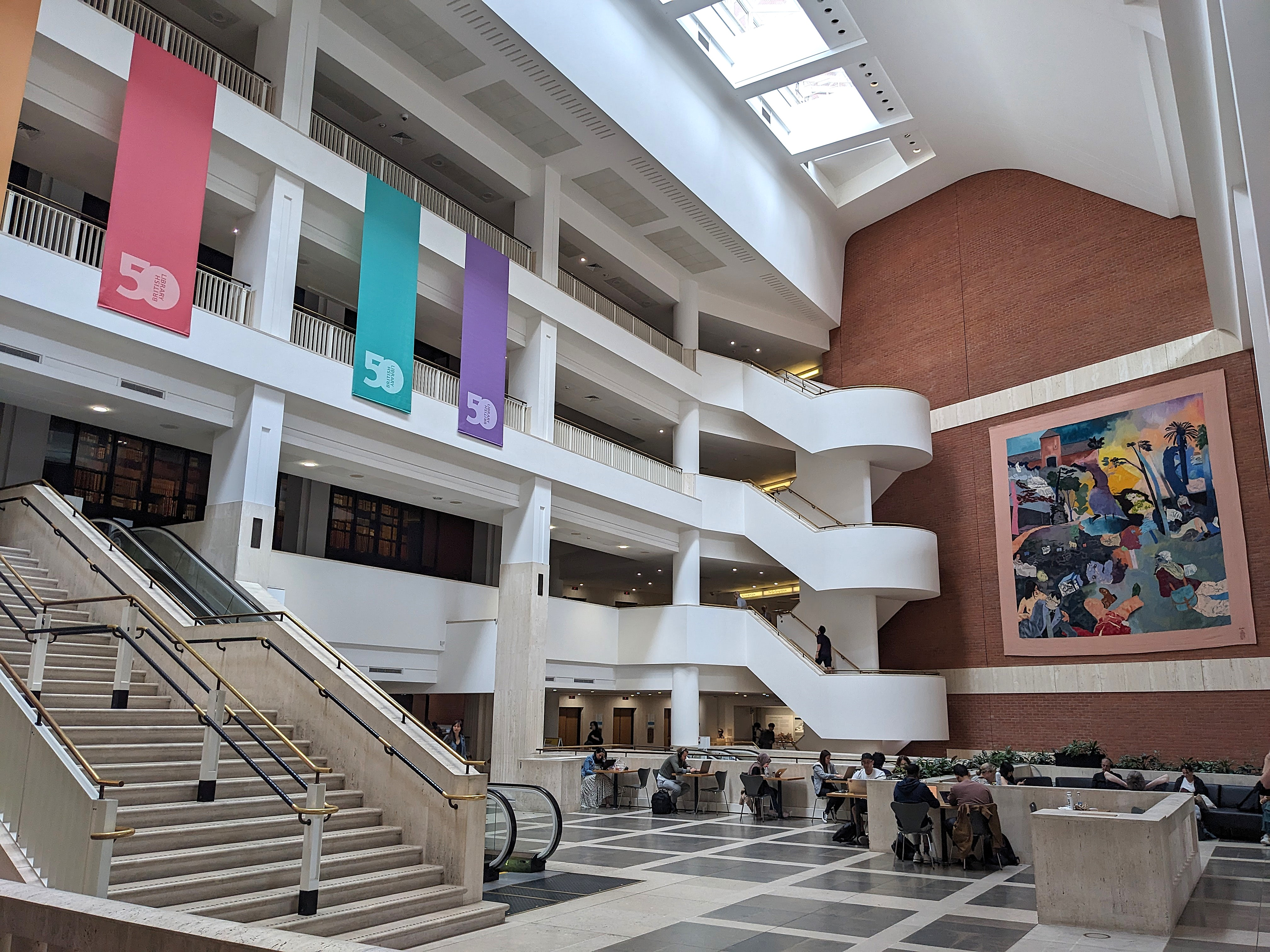
Entrance hall with tapestry

The new library was designed by the architect Colin St John Wilson in collaboration with his wife MJ Long. Facing Euston Road is a large piazza that includes pieces of public art, such as large sculptures by Eduardo Paolozzi (a bronze statue based on William Blake's study of Isaac Newton) and Antony Gormley. It was the largest public building constructed in the United Kingdom in the 20th century.

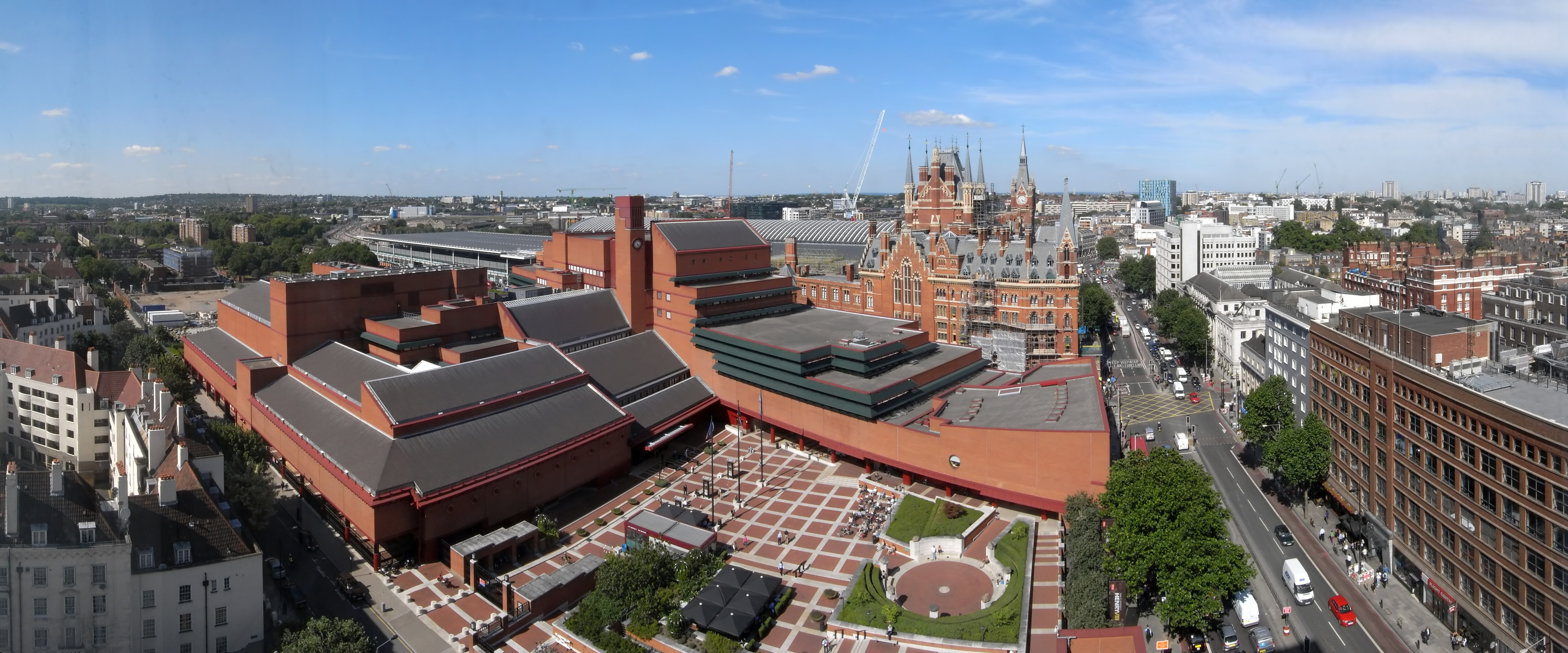
The British Library with St Pancras railway station behind it

A central six-storey glass tower inspired by a similar structure in the Beinecke Library, contains the King's Library with 65,000 printed volumes along with other pamphlets, manuscripts and maps collected by King George III between 1763 and 1820. The Euston Road building was Grade I listed on 1 August 2015.

In December 2009 the storage building at Boston Spa was opened by Rosie Winterton. The facility, costing £26 million, has a capacity for seven million items, stored in more than 140,000 bar-coded containers, which are retrieved by robots from the 162.7 miles of temperature and humidity-controlled storage space.

The British Library has plans to open a third location in Leeds, potentially located in the Grade I listed Temple Works.

==== Digital archiving and Digital Library System ====
In 2005 the British Library started the UK Web Archive project, collecting and preserving websites from the UK. Each time the library collected data, it contacted the website owners for the permission to archive their websites.

In 2012 the UK legal deposit libraries signed a memorandum of understanding that have allowed the library: to automatically collect all websites and create a shared technical infrastructure implementing the Digital Library System (DLS) developed by the British Library. On 5 April 2013 the Library announced a project to archive all sites with the suffix .uk in a bid to preserve the nation's "digital memory" (which as of then amounted to about 4.8 million sites containing 1 billion web pages). The Library made all the material publicly available to users by the end of 2013, and would ensure that, through technological advancements, all the material is preserved for future generations, despite the fluidity of the Internet. After UK government passed the "Legal Deposit Libraries (Non-Print Works) Regulations 2013", British Library were able to add an extension to the Legal Deposit Libraries Act 2003 to include non-print electronic publications from 6 April 2013.

Four storage nodes locations (in London, Boston Spa, Aberystwyth, and Edinburgh) are linked via a secure network in constant communication automatically replicate, self-check, and repair data. A complete crawl of every .uk domain (and other Top-level domains) has been added annually to the DLS since 2013, which also contains all of the Internet Archive's 1996–2013 .uk collection. The policy and system is based on that of the Bibliothèque nationale de France, which has crawled the .fr domain annually since 2006; with the help of the Internet Archive until 2010.

==== 2023 cyber attack ====
British Library highlights film, 2014

On 28 October 2023 the British Library's entire website went down due to a cyber attack, later confirmed as a ransomware attack attributed to ransomware group Rhysida. Catalogues and ordering systems were affected, rendering the great majority of the library's collections inaccessible to readers. The library released statements saying that their services would be disrupted for several weeks, with some disruption expected to persist for several months.

As of January 2024, the British Library continues to experience technology outages as a result of the cyber-attack. By October 2024 many of the previously inaccessible services had been restored, including remote item ordering, online learning services and online manuscripts. A new library management system was launched in late 2025 with an increased access to the catalogue.

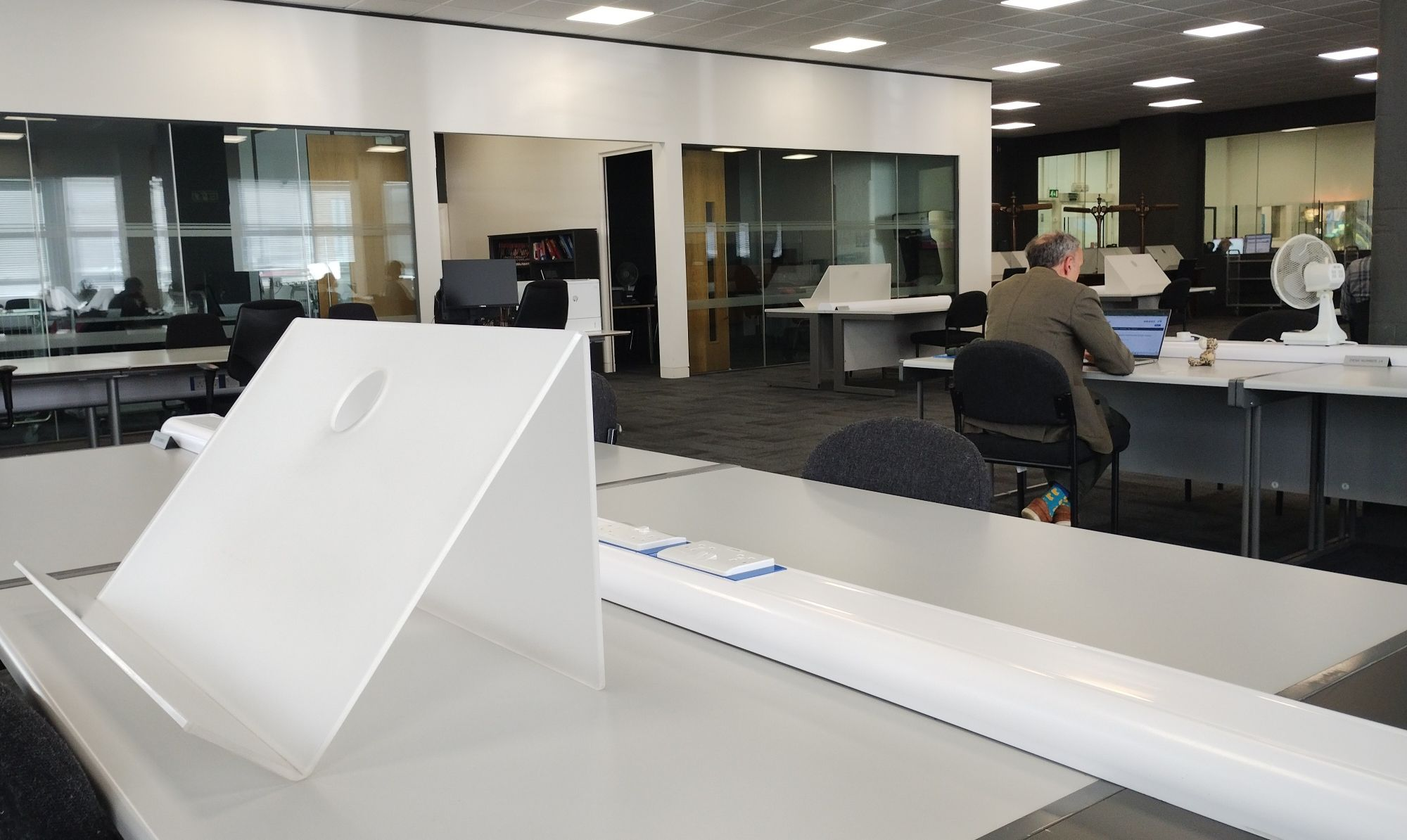
British Library Reading Room at Boston Spa

==== Future expansion ====
In March 2025, the British Library announced plans for a £1.1 billion expansion in partnership with Mitsui Fudosan. The project will expand the library's public spaces, adding 100,000 square feet for cultural, learning, research, and business activities, funded by 600,000 square feet of new commercial and retail areas.

== Collections ==
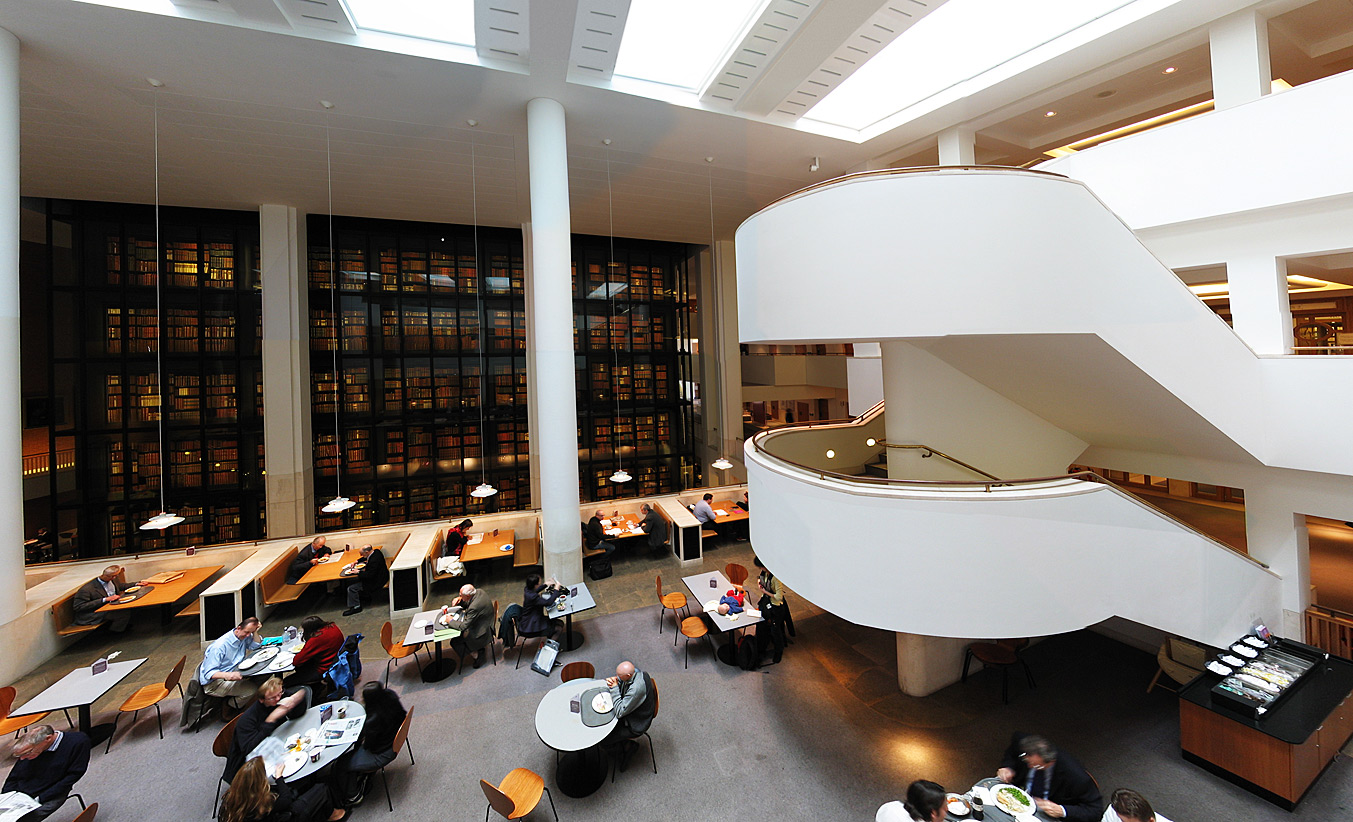
Interior of the British Library, with the smoked glass wall of the King's Library in the background

The British Library is a legal deposit library. In England, legal deposit can be traced back to at least 1610. The Copyright Act 1911 established the principle of the legal deposit, ensuring that the British Library and five other libraries in Great Britain and Ireland are entitled to receive a free copy of every item published or distributed in Britain. The other five libraries are: the Bodleian Library at Oxford; the University Library at Cambridge; Trinity College Library in Dublin; and the National Libraries of Scotland and Wales. The British Library is the only one that must automatically receive a copy of every item published in Britain; the others are entitled to these items, but must specifically request them from the publisher after learning that they have been or are about to be published, a task done centrally by the Agency for the Legal Deposit Libraries.

Under the terms of Irish copyright law (most recently the Copyright and Related Rights Act 2000), the British Library is entitled to automatically receive a free copy of every book published in Ireland, alongside the National Library of Ireland, Trinity College Library in Dublin, the library of the University of Limerick, the library of Dublin City University and the libraries of the four constituent universities of the National University of Ireland. The Bodleian Library, Cambridge University Library, and the National Libraries of Scotland and Wales are also entitled to copies of material published in Ireland, but again must formally make requests.

The Legal Deposit Libraries Act 2003 extended United Kingdom legal deposit requirements to electronic documents, such as CD-ROMs and selected websites.

The British Library Document Supply Service (BLDSS) and the Library's Document Supply Collection and its Secure Electronic Delivery is based at the Library's site in Boston Spa. Collections housed in Yorkshire, comprising low-use material and the newspaper and Document Supply collections, make up around 70% of the total material the library holds. The Library also holds the Asia, Pacific and Africa Collections (APAC) which include the India Office Records and materials in the languages of Asia and of north and north-east Africa.

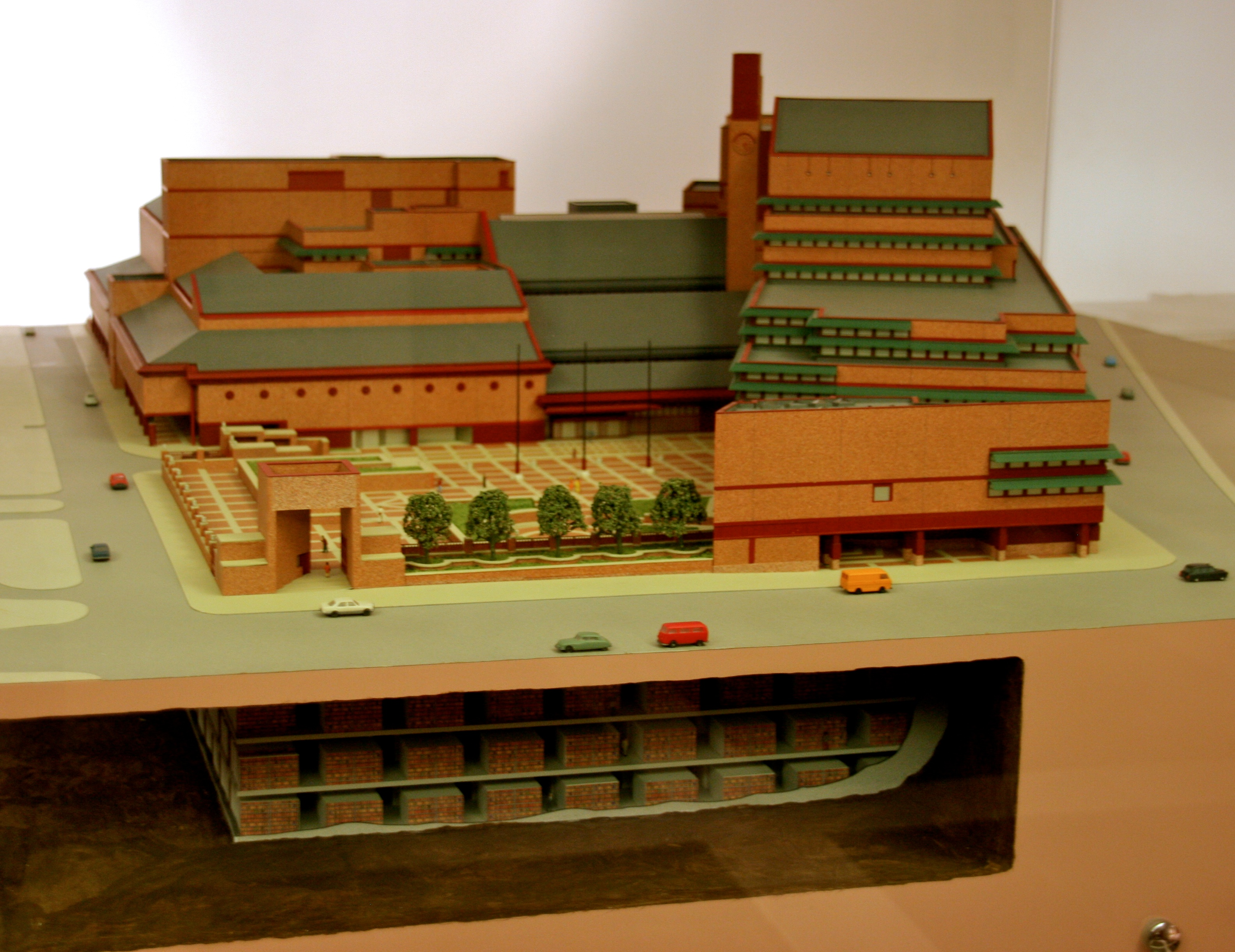
Model of the British Library building featuring the storage levels in the basement beneath the piazza

=== Manuscripts ===
==== Foundation collections ====
The three foundation collections are those which were brought together to form the initial manuscript holdings of the British Museum in 1753:

- Cotton manuscripts
- Harley manuscripts
- Sloane manuscripts

==== Other named collections ====
Examples of other "named" collections of manuscripts include:

- Arundel Manuscripts
- Egerton manuscripts
- King's manuscripts
- Lansdowne manuscripts
- Royal manuscripts
- Stefan Zweig Collection
- Stowe manuscripts
- Yates Thompson manuscripts

Other collections, not necessarily manuscripts:

- Lawrence Durrell Collection

==== Additional manuscripts ====
The Additional Manuscripts series covers manuscripts that are not part of the named collections, and contains all other manuscripts donated, purchased or bequeathed to the Library since 1756. The numbering begins at 4101, as the series was initially regarded as a continuation of the collection of Sloane manuscripts, which are numbered 1 to 4100.

=== Newspapers ===
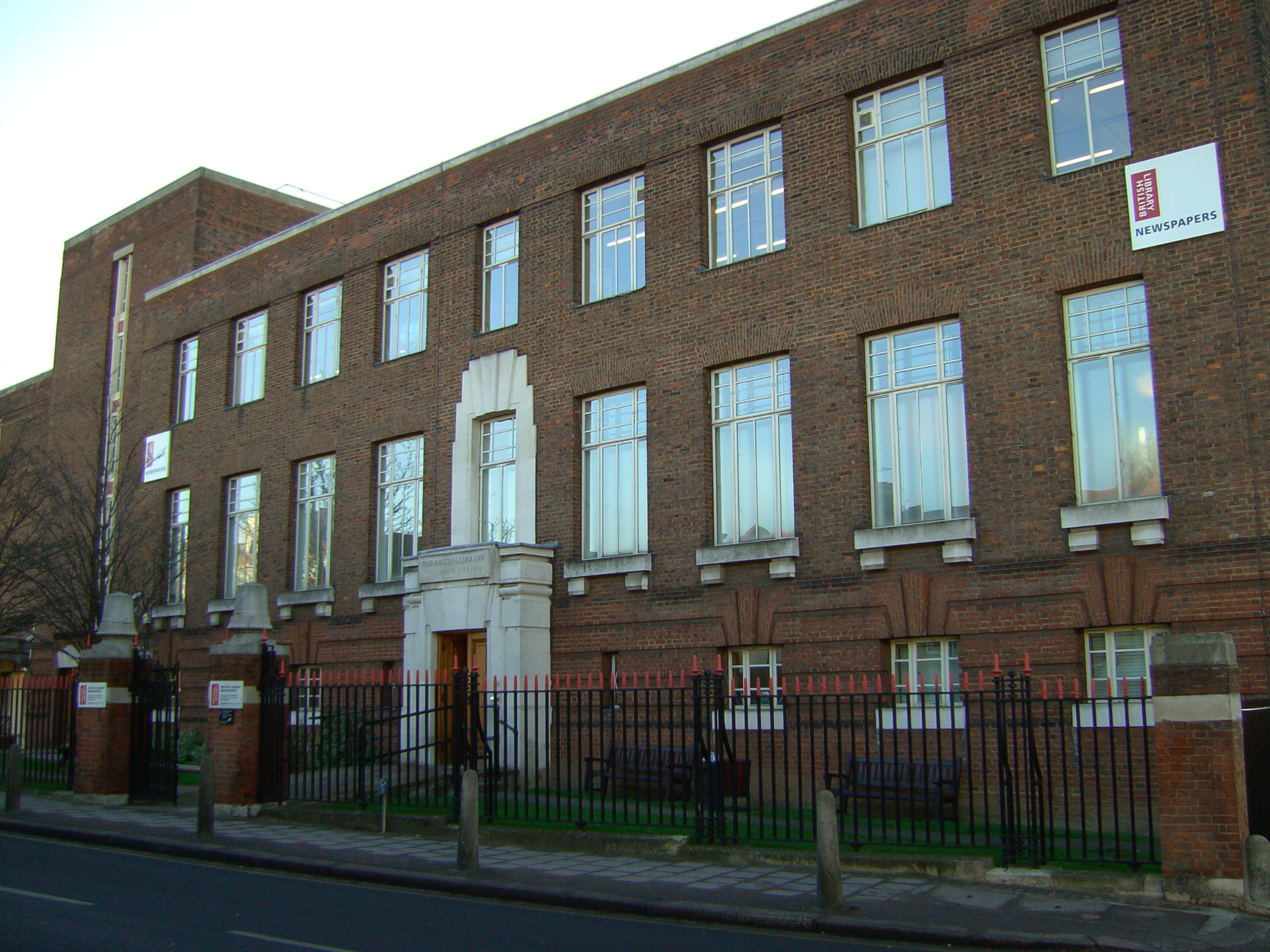
Former British Library Newspapers building, Colindale

The Library holds an almost complete collection of British and Irish newspapers since 1840. This is partly because of the legal deposit legislation of 1869, which required newspapers to supply a copy of each edition of a newspaper to the library. London editions of national daily and Sunday newspapers are complete back to 1801. In total, the collection consists of 660,000 bound volumes and 370,000 reels of microfilm containing tens of millions of newspapers with 52,000 titles on 45 km (28 mi) of shelves. From earlier dates, the collections include the Thomason Tracts, comprising 7,200 seventeenth-century newspapers, and the Burney Collection, featuring nearly 1 million pages of newspapers from the late 18th and early 19th centuries.

The section also holds extensive collections of non-British newspapers, in numerous languages. In the late 1990s, the then chief executive, Brian Lang, instituted a policy of disposing of archives of foreign newspapers. The policy only came to light when author Nicholson Baker protested about it, and was halted by Lynne Brindley when she became chief executive.

The Newspapers section was based in Colindale in North London until 2013, when the buildings, which were considered to provide inadequate storage conditions and to be beyond improvement, were closed and sold for redevelopment. The physical holdings are now divided between the sites at St Pancras (some high-use periodicals, and rare items such as the Thomason Tracts and Burney collections) and Boston Spa (the bulk of the collections, stored in a new purpose-built facility).

A significant and growing proportion of the collection is now made available to readers as surrogate facsimiles, either on microfilm, or, more recently, in digitised form. In 2010 a ten-year programme of digitisation of the newspaper archives with commercial partner DC Thomson subsidiary Brightsolid began, and the British Newspaper Archive was launched in November 2011. A dedicated newspaper reading room opened at St Pancras in April 2014, including facilities for consulting microfilmed and digital materials, and, where no surrogate exists, hard-copy material retrieved from Boston Spa.

=== Online, electronic and digital resources ===
The British Library makes a number of images of items within its collections available online. Its Online Gallery gives access to 30,000 images from various medieval books, together with a handful of exhibition-style items in a proprietary format, such as the Lindisfarne Gospels. This includes the facility to "turn the virtual pages" of a few documents, such as Leonardo da Vinci's notebooks. Catalogue entries for many of the illuminated manuscript collections are available online, with selected images of pages or miniatures from a growing number of them, and there is a database of significant bookbindings.

When Google Books started, the British Library signed an agreement with Microsoft to digitise a number of books from the British Library for its Live Search Books project. This material was only available to readers in the US, and closed in May 2008. The scanned books are currently available via the British Library catalogue or Amazon.

In October 2010 the British Library launched its Management and business studies portal. This website is designed to allow digital access to management research reports, consulting reports, working papers and articles.

In November 2011, four million newspaper pages from the 18th and 19th centuries were made available online as the British Newspaper Archive. The project planned to scan up to 40 million pages over the next 10 years. The archive is free to search, but there is a charge for accessing the pages themselves.

As of 2022, Explore the British Library is the latest iteration of the online catalogue. It contains nearly 57 million records and may be used to search, view and order items from the collections or search the contents of the Library's website. The Library's electronic collections include over 40,000 ejournals, 800 databases and other electronic resources. A number of these are available for remote access to registered St Pancras Reader Pass holders.

PhD theses are currently not available via the E-Theses Online Service (EThOS) since the cyberattack but the library intends to start work to restore the collection later in 2026.

=== Philatelic collections ===
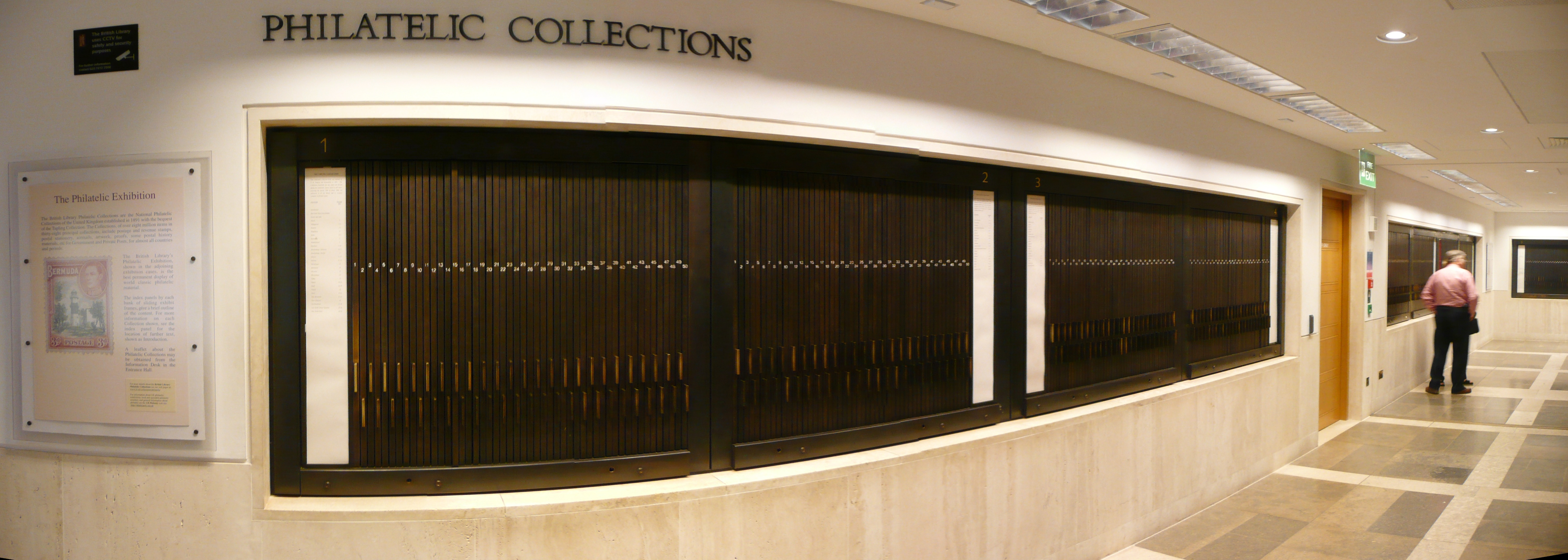
Philatelic collections

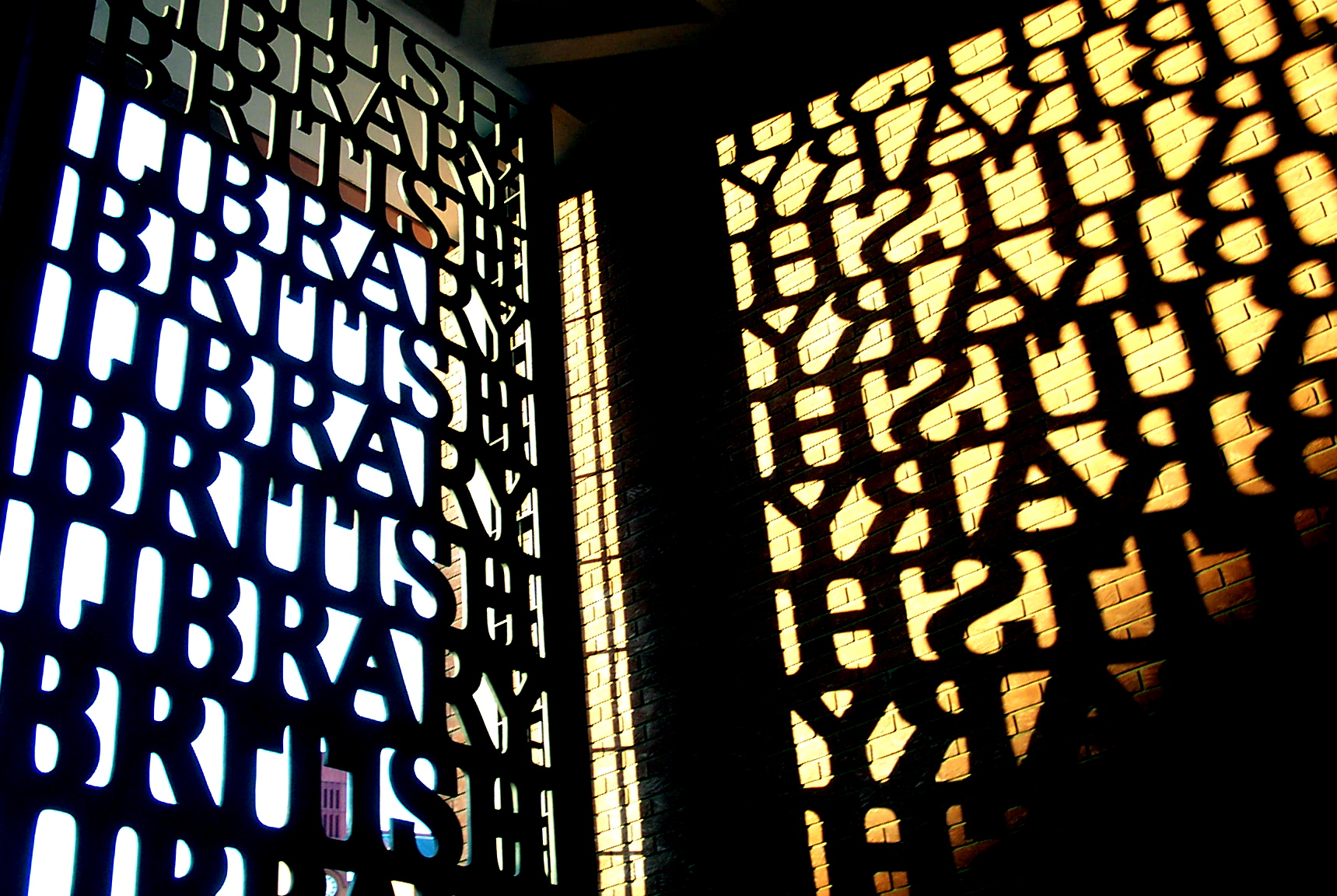
The entrance gate and its shadow (designed by David Kindersley and Lida Lopes Cardozo Kindersley)

The British Library Philatelic Collections are held at St Pancras. The collections were established in 1891 with the donation of the Tapling collection; they steadily developed and now comprise over 25 major collections and a number of smaller ones, encompassing a wide range of disciplines. The collections include postage and revenue stamps, postal stationery, essays, proofs, covers and entries, "cinderella stamp" material, specimen issues, airmails, some postal history materials, official and private posts, etc., for almost all countries and periods. Approximately 80,000 items on 6,000 sheets may be viewed in 1,000 display frames; 2,400 sheets are from the Tapling Collection. All other material, which covers the whole world, is available to students and researchers.

== Facilities ==
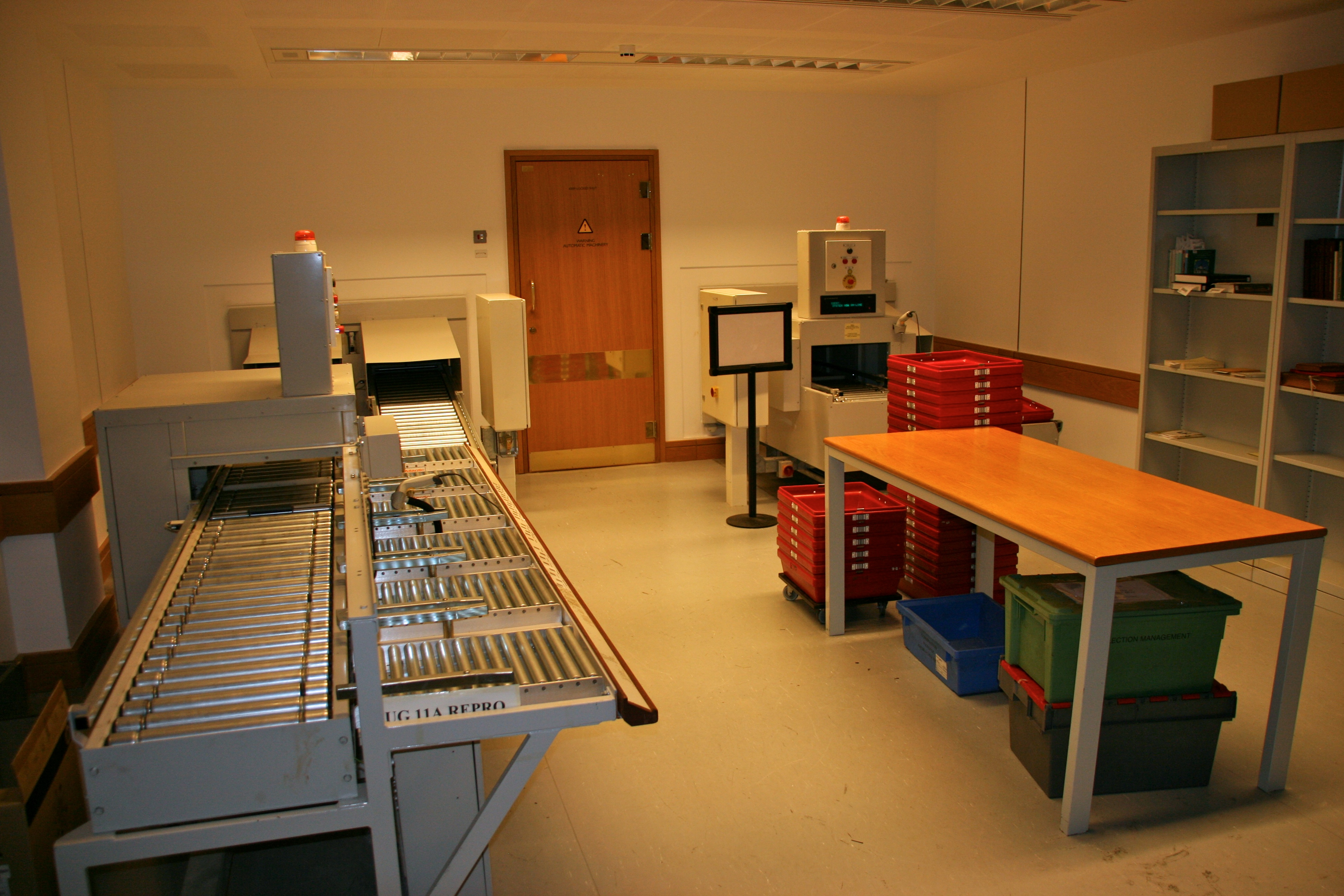
The mechanical book handling system (MBHS) used to deliver requested books from stores to reading rooms

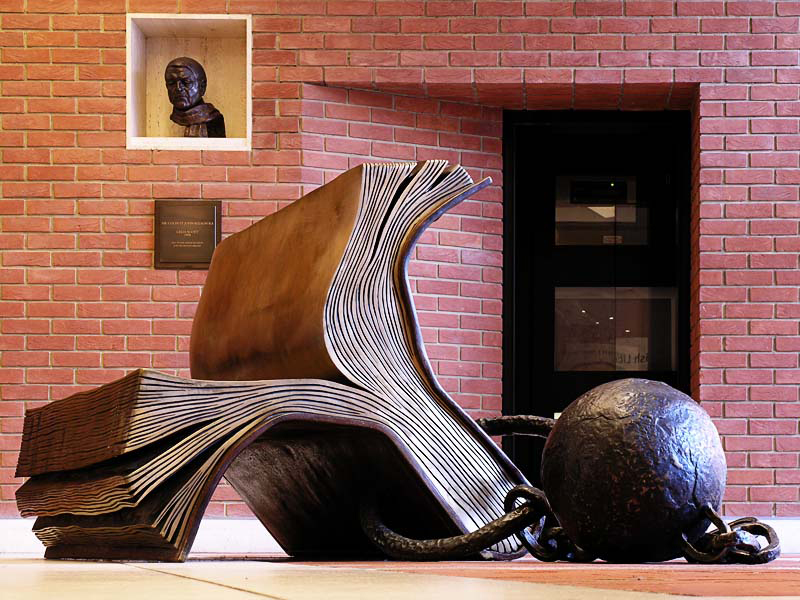
Bronze sculpture. Bill Woodrow's Sitting on History was purchased for the British Library by Carl Djerassi and Diane Middlebrook in 1997. Sitting on History, with its ball and chain, refers to the book as the captor of information which we cannot escape. The bust visible at top left is Colin St. John Wilson RA by Celia Scott, 1998, a gift from the American Trust for the British Library. Sir Colin designed the British Library building.

While the Library previously required anyone applying for a reader pass to have a genuine academic need, anyone with a permanent address who wishes to carry out research can apply for a Reader Pass; they are required to provide proof of signature and address.

Historically, only those wishing to use specialised material unavailable in other public or academic libraries would be given a Reader Pass. The Library has been criticised for admitting numbers of undergraduate students, who have access to their own university libraries, to the reading rooms. The Library replied that it has always admitted undergraduates as long as they have a legitimate personal, work-related or academic research purpose.

The majority of catalogue entries can be found on Explore the British Library, the Library's main catalogue, which is based on Primo. Other collections have their own catalogues, such as western manuscripts. There are eleven reading rooms at the London site and one in Yorkshire.

British Library Reader Pass holders are also able to view the Document Supply Collection in the Reading Room at the Library's site in Boston Spa in Yorkshire as well as the hard-copy newspaper collection from 29 September 2014. Now that access is available to legal deposit collection material, it is necessary for visitors to register as a Reader to use the Boston Spa Reading Room.

== Exhibitions ==
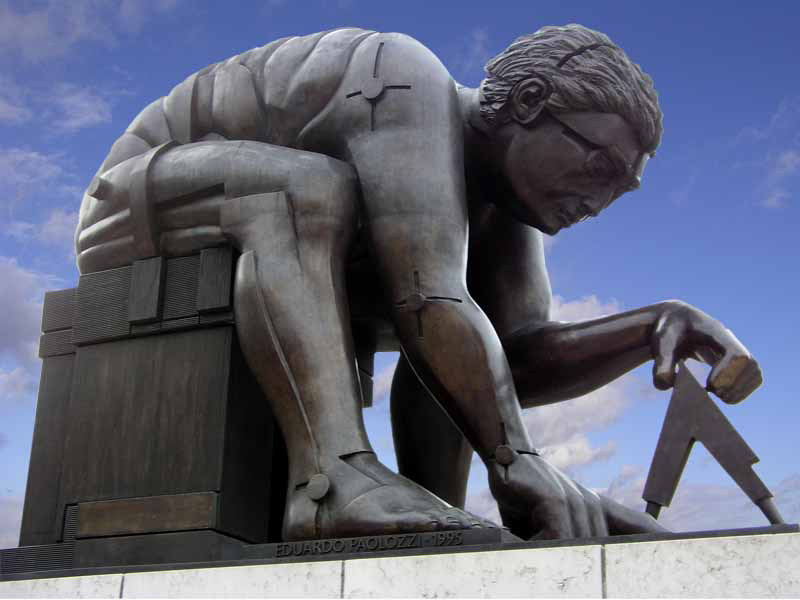
Bronze sculpture on the piazza of Newton, after William Blake, by Eduardo Paolozzi, 1995

A number of books and manuscripts are on display to the public in the Sir John Ritblat Gallery which is open seven days a week at no charge. Items on display change, but manuscripts recently in the exhibition have included Beowulf, the Lindisfarne Gospels and St Cuthbert Gospel, a Gutenberg Bible, Geoffrey Chaucer's Canterbury Tales, Thomas Malory's Le Morte d'Arthur (King Arthur), Captain Cook's journal, Jane Austen's History of England, Charlotte Brontë's Jane Eyre, Lewis Carroll's Alice's Adventures Under Ground, Rudyard Kipling's Just So Stories, Charles Dickens's Nicholas Nickleby, Virginia Woolf's Mrs Dalloway and a room devoted solely to Magna Carta, as well as several Qur'ans and Asian items.

In addition to the permanent exhibition, there are frequent thematic exhibitions which have covered maps, sacred texts, history of the English language, and law, including a celebration of the 800th anniversary of Magna Carta.

== Services and departments ==
=== Business and IP Centre ===
In May 2005, the British Library received a grant of £1 million from the London Development Agency to change two of its reading rooms into the Business & IP Centre. The centre was opened in March 2006. It holds a comprehensive collection of business and intellectual property (IP) material and is part of the UK's National Network of Business and IP Centres.

The collection is divided up into four main information areas: market research, company information, trade directories, and journals. It is free of charge in hard copy and online via approximately 30 subscription databases. Registered readers can access the collection and the databases. Staff are trained to guide small and medium enterprises (SME) and entrepreneurs to use the full range of resources.

There are over 50 million patent specifications from 40 countries in a collection dating back to 1855. The collection also includes official gazettes on patents, trade marks and Registered Design; law reports and other material on litigation; and information on copyright. This is available in hard copy and via online databases.

In 2018, a Human Lending Library service was established in the Business & IP Centre, allowing social entrepreneurs to receive an hour's mentoring from a high-profile business professional. This service is run in partnership with Expert Impact.

=== Document Supply Service ===
As part of its establishment in 1973, the British Library absorbed the National Lending Library for Science and Technology (NLL), based near Boston Spa in Yorkshire, which had been established in 1961. Before this, the site had housed a World War II Royal Ordnance Factory, ROF Thorp Arch, which closed in 1957. When the NLL became part of the British Library in 1973 it changed its name to the British Library Lending Division, in 1985 it was renamed as the British Library Document Supply Centre and is now known as the British Library Document Supply Service, often abbreviated as BLDSS.

BLDSS now holds 87.5 million items, including 296,000 international journal titles, 400,000 conference proceedings, 3 million monographs, 5 million official publications, and 500,000 UK and North American theses and dissertations. 12.5 million articles in the Document Supply Collection are held electronically and can be downloaded immediately.

The collection supports research and development in UK, overseas and international industry, particularly in the pharmaceutical industry. BLDSS also provides material to Higher Education institutions, students and staff and members of the public, who can order items through their public library or through the Library's BL Document Supply Service (BLDSS).

In April 2013, BLDSS launched its new online ordering and tracking system, which enables customers to search available items, view detailed availability, pricing and delivery time information, place and track orders, and manage account preferences online.

=== Sound archive ===
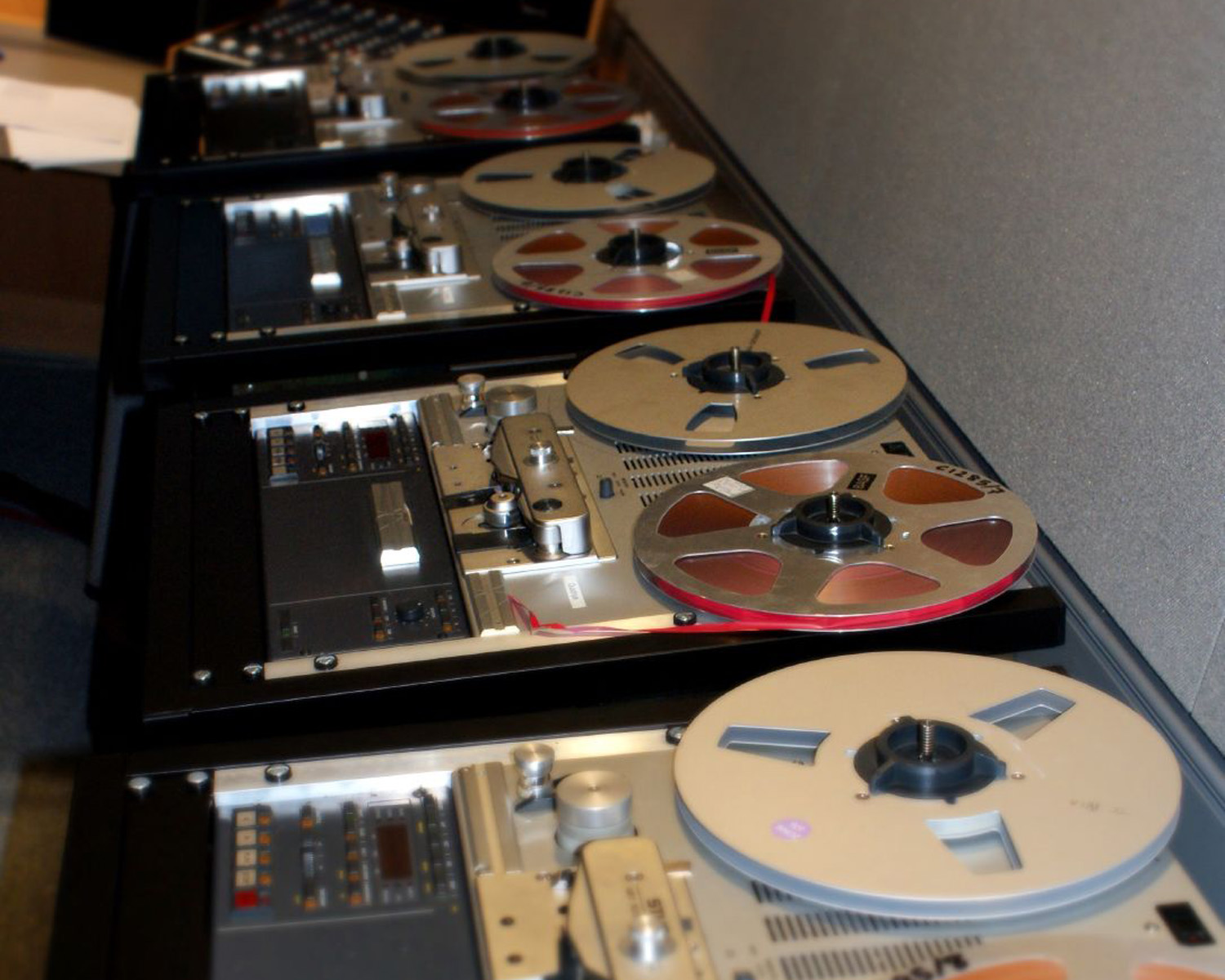
Tape players used in the British Library Sound Archives, 2009 photo

The British Library Sound Archive holds more than a million discs and 185,000 tapes. The collections come from all over the world and cover the entire range of recorded sound, from music, drama and literature to oral history and wildlife sounds, stretching back over more than 100 years.

It is possible to listen to recordings from the collection in selected Reading Rooms in the Library through their SoundServer and Listening and Viewing Service, which is based in the Rare Books & Music Reading Room.

In 2006, the Library launched a new online resource, British Library Sounds, which makes 50,000 of the Sound Archive's recordings available online.

=== Moving image services ===
Launched in October 2012, the British Library's moving image services provide access to nearly a million sound and moving image items onsite, supported by data for over 20 million sound and moving image recordings. The three services, which for copyright reasons can only be accessed from terminals within the Reading Rooms at St Pancras or Boston Spa, are:

- BBC Pilot/Redux: A collaboration with BBC Research & Development to mirror its archive which has, since June 2007, been recording 24/7 of all of the BBC's national and some regional broadcast output. BBC Pilot includes 2.2 million catalogue records and 225,000 playable programmes, but unlike BBC Redux it does not include any broadcasts beyond 2011. BBC Redux ceased operations in 2022.
- Broadcast News: Since May 2010, the British Library has been making off-air recordings of daily TV and radio news broadcasts from seventeen channels, including BBC, ITV, Channel 4, Sky News, Al-Jazeera English, NHK World, CNN, France 24, Bloomberg, Russia Today and China's CCTV News. Many of the programs come with subtitles, which can be electronically searched, greatly enhancing the value of the collection as a research tool.
- Television & Radio Index for Learning & Teaching (TRILT): Produced by the British Universities Film & Video Council (BUFVC), TRILT is a database of all UK television and radio broadcasts since 2001 (and selectively back to 1995). Its 16 million records, growing by a million per year, cover every channel, broadcast and repeat.

== Other projects ==
The British Library sponsors or co-sponsors many projects of national and international significance. These include:

- Incunabula Short Title Catalogue (since 1980)
- International Dunhuang Project (since 1994)
- Theatre Archive Project (since 2003)
- Endangered Archives Programme (since 2004)
- DataCite, an international not-for-profit organisation which aims to improve data citation (since 2009)
- Public Lending Right for the United Kingdom

== Chief executives and other employees ==
British Library employees undertake a wide variety of roles including curatorial, business and technology. Curatorial roles include or have included librarians, curators, digital preservationists, archivists and keepers. In 2001 the senior management team was established and consisted of Lynne Brindley (chief executive), Ian Millar (director of finance and corporate resources), Natalie Ceeney (director of operations and services), Jill Finney (director of strategic marketing and communications) and Clive Field (director of scholarship and collections). This was so the problems of a complex structure, a mega hybrid library, global brand and investment in digital preservation could be managed better

=== Chief executives ===
- 1973–1984: Sir Harry Hookway, first chief executive
- 1984–1991: Kenneth Cooper
- 1991–2000: Brian Lang
- 2000–2012: Dame Lynne Brindley
- 2012–2025: Sir Roly Keating
- January 2025 – November 2025: Rebecca Lawrence
- November 2025–October 2026: Jeremy Silver (interim)
- From November 2026: Paul Bate

=== Chief librarians ===
- 2016–2018: Caroline Brazier, first chief librarian, worked at the library 2002–2018
- 2018–2025: Liz Jolly

== See also ==
- British Library of Political and Economic Science, the main library of the LSE
- British literature
- Books in the United Kingdom
- List of libraries in the United Kingdom
- The National Archives (United Kingdom), an amalgamation of the Public Record Office, the Historical Manuscripts Commission, the Office of Public Sector Information and Her Majesty's Stationery Office
