= King's manuscripts, British Library =

Collection of manuscripts held at the British Library

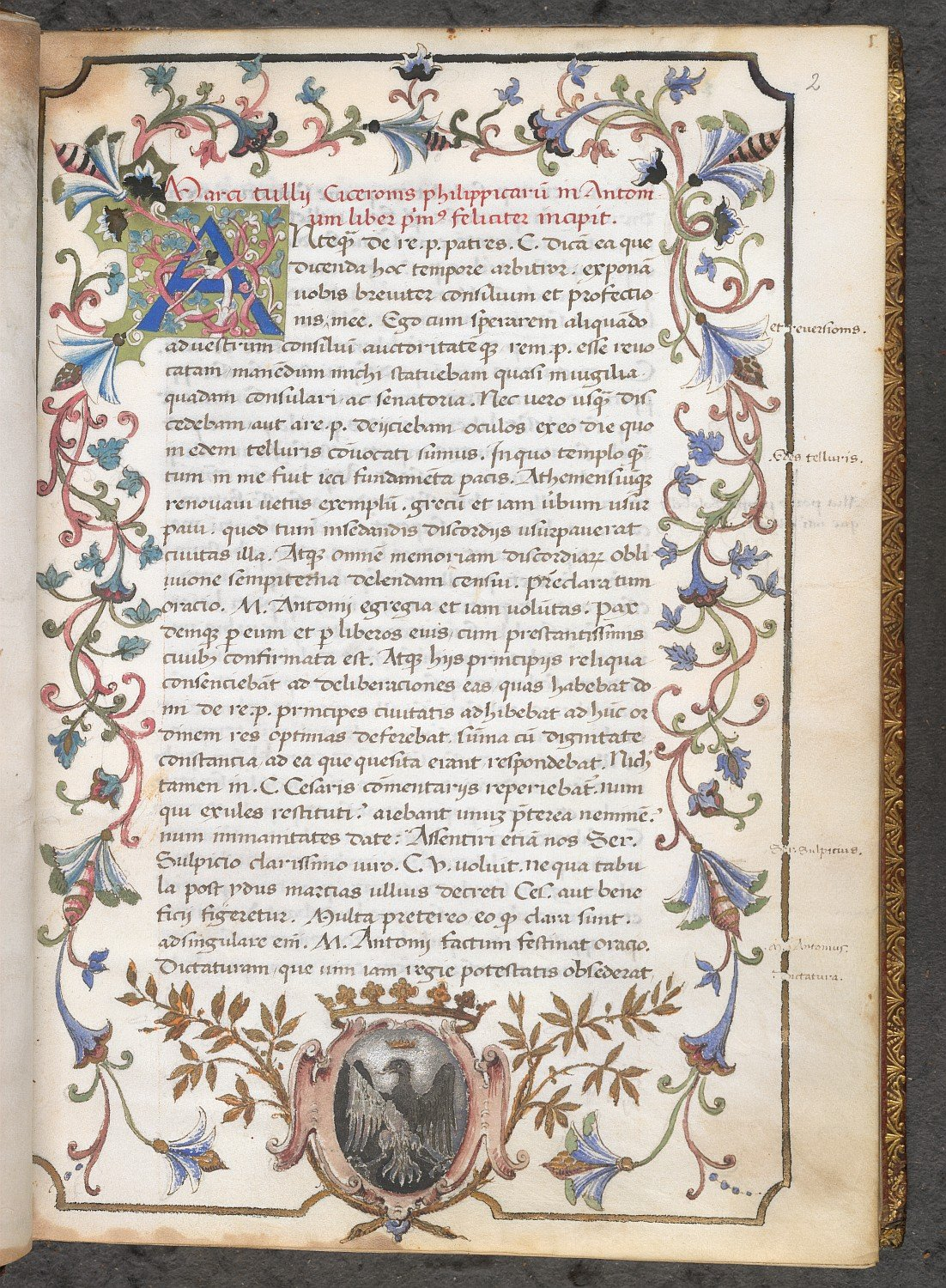
First page of an Italian illuminated manuscript of Cicero's Philippics; Kings MS 21 f. 2.

The King's manuscripts are a collection of 446 historical manuscripts held in the British Library. The collection was originally assembled by King George III, and was passed to the British Museum by George IV in 1823 as part of the King's Library. The manuscripts were at first kept with the printed books, but in 1840 were transferred to the Department of Manuscripts. The manuscript maps remained in the Department of Printed Books, and are now held in the Map Library as the King's Topographical Collection.

== See also ==
- Royal manuscripts, British Library
