= Secure Electronic Delivery =

Secure Electronic Delivery (SED) is a service created in 2003 and provided by the British Library Document Supply Service (BLDSS). Its purpose is to enable faster delivery of digital materials as encrypted, copyright-compliant PDF Documents, to a personal e-mail address. These documents are supplied from the British Library via its On Demand service. When the British Library supplies articles electronically, it sends them securely in order to ensure its usage is permitted (research purposes) and copyright law is observed.

== Methods ==
As the publishing industry, authors and creators become highly protective of their assets and intellectual property, they impose strict rules on delivery methods to prevent copyright infringement. Nowadays, DRM-enabled secure delivery appears to be the most widely used solution to address issues faced by libraries in supplying ebooks and digital materials to their users. SED, one of these solutions, is using Adobe LiveCycle Digital Rights Management (LCDRM) as an encryption method to deliver documents.

== Advantages ==
SED offers convenience, quality and speed as documents are delivered upon request at any location and on any device. Requested articles are scanned for high quality reproduction, opened anywhere on any machine, including mobile devices.

== Restrictions ==
The following restrictions hold in a SED service implementation:

- The digital material is accessible only for 14 days via a link sent to a personal message.
- Due to copyright reasons, the material can be opened only once, saved for 14 days and does not allow a copy-paste action.
- Upon display, the material must be printed from the same device and reprinted only once.
- The On Demand encryption technology works best on the default Safari browser although other browsers may accommodate it.

== See also ==
- Digital rights management
- Digital asset management
