= Liz Jolly =

British librarian

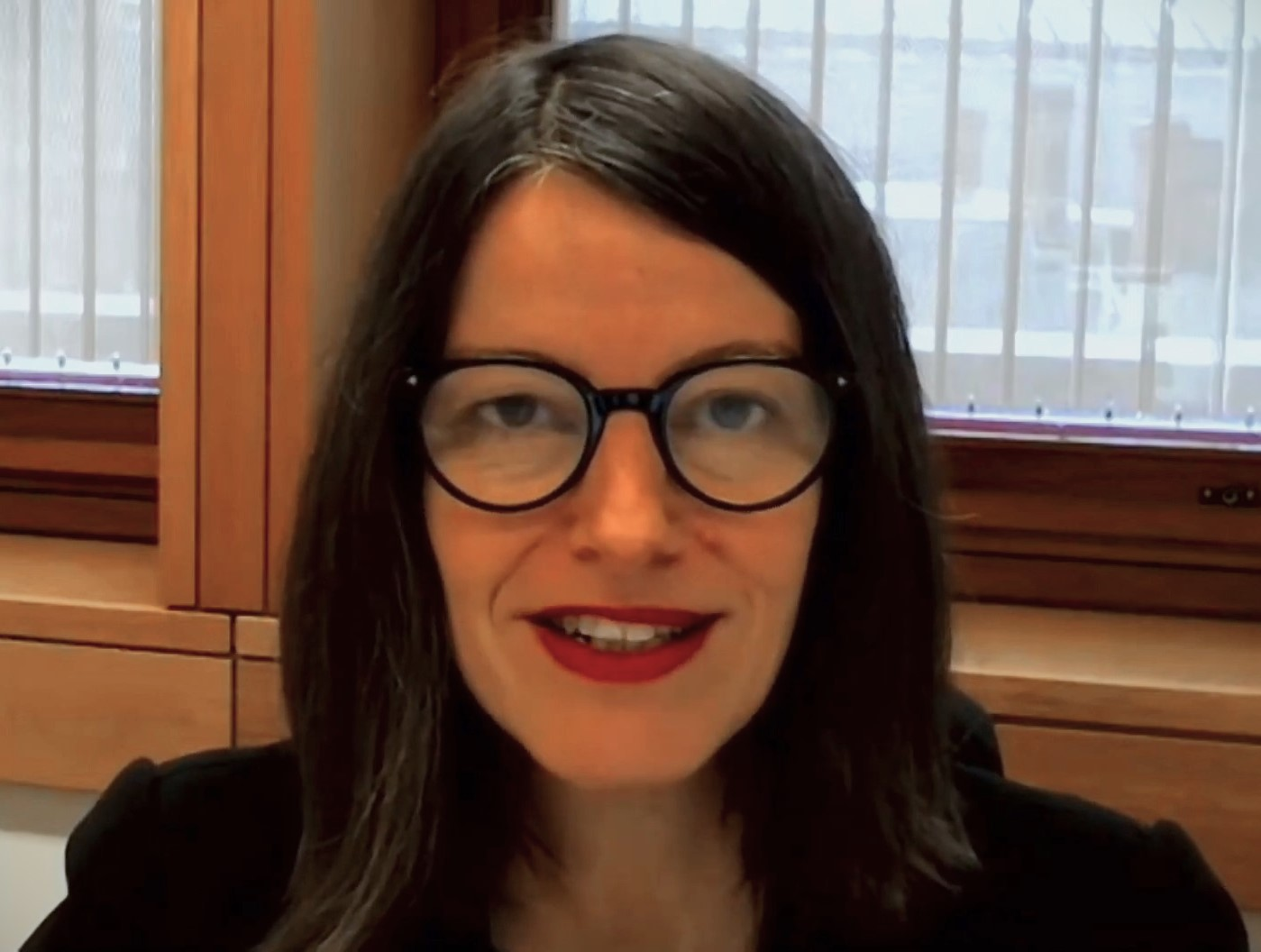
- Jolly in 2021
- Occupation: Librarian
- Employer: University College Cork

Liz Jolly is a British librarian and is currently the University Librarian at University College Cork. She was previously Chief Librarian of the British Library assuming the position on 24 September 2018. She was previously the Director of Library and Information Services, then the Director of Student and Library Services at Teesside University from 2008 to 2018. She was previously employed at the University of Salford, the University of East London, and London South Bank University. She is also a fellow of the Chartered Institute of Library and Information Professionals, the Royal Society for the Encouragement of Arts, Manufacturers & Commerce, and a Principal Fellow of the Higher Education Academy. She is a member of the editorial board of the New Review of Academic Librarianship.
