= King's Library =

Part of the British Library

Coordinates: 51.51958°N 0.12630°W

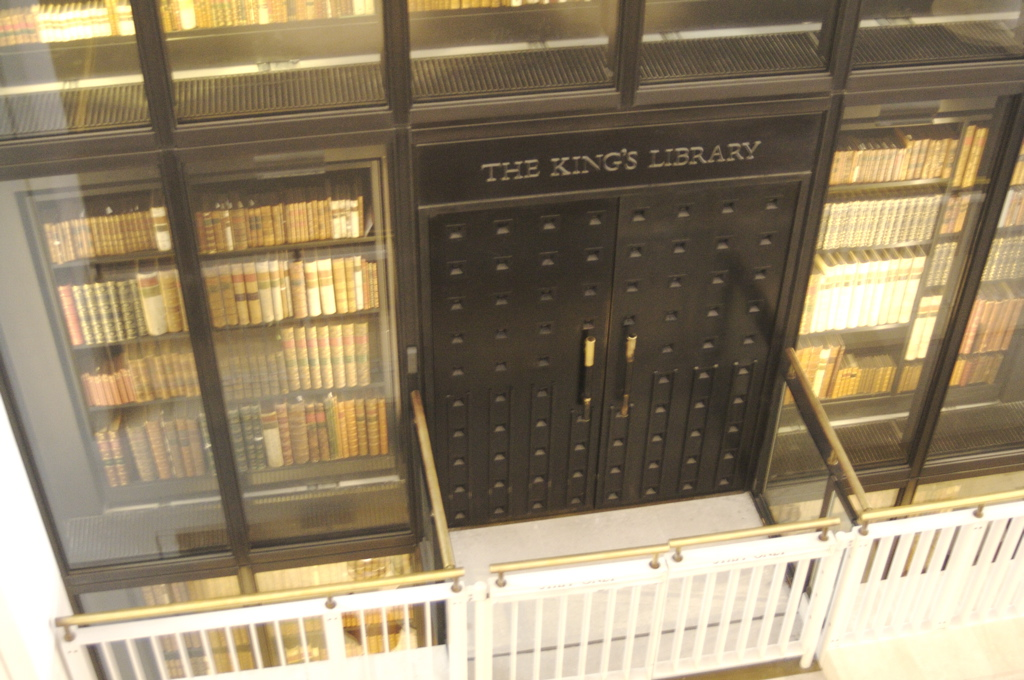
The King's Library tower in the British Library

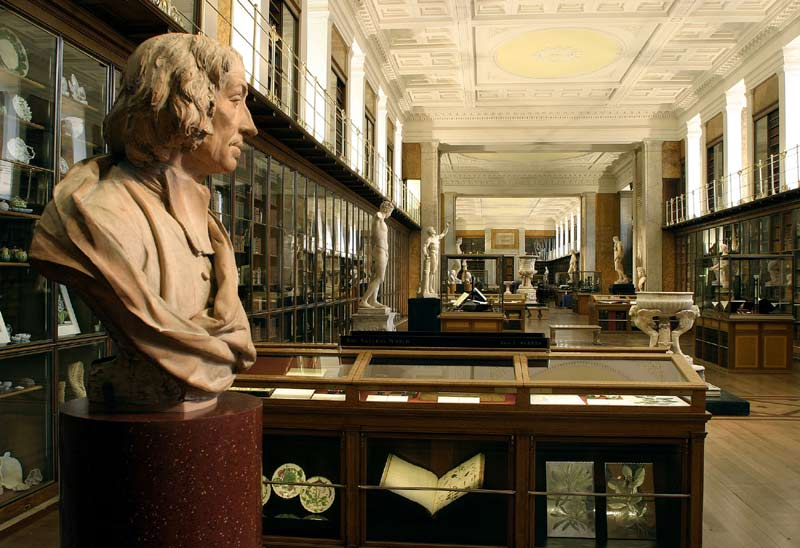
The King's Library gallery, now the Enlightenment Gallery at the British Museum, the former home of the collection.

The King's Library was one of the most important collections of books and pamphlets of the Age of Enlightenment. Assembled by George III (r.1760–1820), this scholarly library of over 65,000 volumes was subsequently given to the British nation by his son, George IV. It was housed in a specially built gallery in the British Museum from 1827 to 1997 and now forms part of the British Library. The term "King's Library" was until recently also used to refer to the gallery in the British Museum built for the collection, which is now called the "Enlightenment Gallery" and displays a wide range of objects relating to the Enlightenment.

== History of the library ==
=== In the reign of George III ===
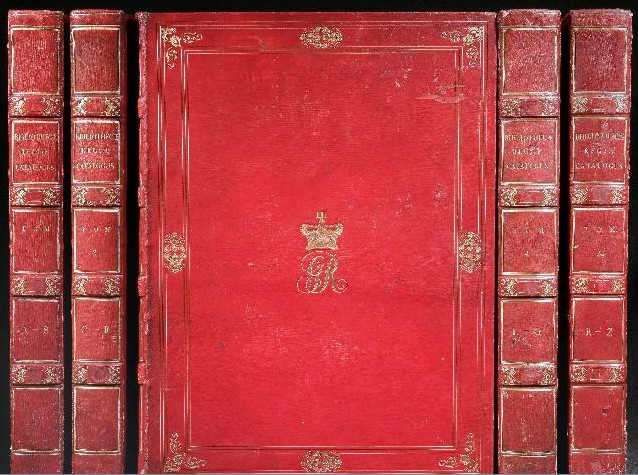
Bibliothecae Regiae Catalogus

When George III became king in 1760 he did not inherit a library of any size, as George II had given the Old Royal Library, including today's Royal manuscripts, to the British Museum three years earlier. As a learned man, George III had a genuine regard for learning, developed under the influence of his tutor the Earl of Bute. On becoming king he quickly began assembling a new collection of mainly scholarly works, the project beginning in earnest in 1762–1763 with the purchase of the library of Joseph Smith. Smith had been collecting in Venice for several decades, acquiring books from a range of sources in north Italy and also buying through the international book trade. The collection was notable for its 260 incunabula, including many early Venetian and north Italian volumes with fine illumination and bindings. In total the king bought 6,000 volumes from Smith. These were not kept together in George III's library, but nevertheless can be identified by the word "Smith" marked in each volume by the king's librarian.

There do not seem to have been any further large purchases before 1766, perhaps because the library's staff were occupied with organising the books acquired from Smith. However, from 1766 onwards the king began to develop the collection significantly, spending an average of perhaps £1,500 per year on books for the rest of his reign. A particularly important period was 1768–1771, when Frederick Augusta Barnard, one of the library staff, travelled extensively in Europe on the king's behalf, and made major purchases. Important acquisitions later came from the libraries of James West, Anthony Askew, Richard Farmer and Grimur Jonsson Thorkelin as each of these came on the market. Significant donations to the library included 27 incunabula given by Jacob Bryant in 1782. The acquisition of further titles continued in the last years of the king's reign, when due to his mental illness his affairs were managed by trustees.

The library was kept at the Queen's House, the residence later to be extended and renamed Buckingham Palace. There it occupied four specially built rooms. From at least the 1770s bookbinding was carried out on the premises, and by 1776 the bindery occupied five rooms in the basement. The library style of binding can be described as 'fine, but not extravagant'. Richard Dalton, employed as a librarian by George III from 1755 onwards, was in charge of the collection until 1774. He was followed by Barnard, who was chief librarian until the collection's transfer to the British Museum. It seems unlikely that Dalton had any major influence over the way the collection was to develop, but that Barnard played a central role, for instance making many, or perhaps most, of the decisions about what books to buy. Samuel Johnson also advised on the library's collection policy. The library was open to anyone with a genuine scholarly purpose, and in George's lifetime was visited by John Adams and Joseph Priestley as well as Johnson. It is noteworthy that the king allowed scholars such as Priestley, whose political and religious opinions he disagreed with, to use the library.

=== At the British Museum, 1827–1997 ===
When George III died in 1820 it was unclear what he had intended to happen to the library after his death, and also whether it was now the personal property of his heir, George IV, or belonged to the Crown. These issues were resolved in January 1823 when, after a period of negotiation with the government, George IV wrote to Prime Minister Lord Liverpool offering the library to the nation. In the intervening period rumours had appeared in the British press that he was considering selling the library to the Tsar; it is not known if there was any truth in these. By giving away the library, the king was able to avoid the expense of its upkeep (over £2,000 per year) at a time of financial difficulty and also facilitate the redevelopment of Buckingham Palace, a project of great importance to him. He specified that the library was to be kept together, and separate from any other collection.

Within months Parliament had agreed that the British Museum was to be the collection's new home, although some newspapers and public figures still argued for the establishment of a new library to house the books in a different part of London. The museum lacked the room to house the collection, but plans for a significant neoclassical extension of the museum's buildings had already been drawn up by the architect Robert Smirke. While the government had for some time resisted the museum's requests for money for this project, the need to provide a fitting home for the library meant that it now agreed to fund the building work. Thus the arrival of the King's Library was a catalyst for the growth of the museum into the grand building we see today. With few changes to the original plans, the east wing of Smirke's extension to the museum became the library's new home. Constructed in 1823-7 and measuring 300 feet (91 metres) in length, this gallery has been called 'one of the noblest rooms in London'.

The library was a major addition to the museum's book collection, adding 65,000 volumes to an existing 116,000; the museum estimated that only 21,000 of these were duplicates. Furthermore, many of the King's Library's strengths, such as geography, theology and Spanish and Italian literature, were areas which so far had been rather poorly represented among the museum's books. George IV retained 33 printed books from the library for himself. These were mostly incunabula, including a Mainz Psalter which is now in the Royal Library, Windsor, but also included a Shakespeare First Folio. George IV also kept back two manuscripts: one by Samuel Johnson, containing plans for projected books, and a copy of the Vedas in Sanskrit, made in Benares in 1776.

During the 1840s approximately 13% of the books consulted in the museum were from the King's Library. This percentage declined as the museum's book collection grew in subsequent decades, but the King's Library remained well-used. From 1857, the gallery was used to display notable volumes from the whole of the museum's printed books collection. Towards the end of the First World War, an increased number of air raids led the museum to move the most valuable books out of London, many going to the National Library of Wales. This precaution was repeated just prior to the outbreak of the Second World War. In the early hours of 23 September 1940 a bomb hit the museum, leaving 261 works (368 volumes) in the King's Library totally destroyed and a further 17 works in 11 bound volumes severely damaged. The rest of the collection was moved to a safer part of the building, and finally evacuated from London to the Bodleian Library in Oxford in 1943. Repair work to the gallery was finally carried out in 1950–1951.

=== At the British Library, 1997 to present ===
In the 1970s preparations began for the move of the museum's book collection to the newly established British Library. The museum's Trustees argued that the King's Library should remain where it was, but were unsuccessful in preventing its transfer to the new institution. The collection is now housed in the King's Library Tower, a six-storey glass and bronze structure in the British Library's entrance hall; the tower was designed specially by the building's architect, Colin St John Wilson, and also contains the Thomas Grenville collection. Items from the collection remain available for reading by the public. The collection's old home at the British Museum, restored in 2000–2003, is now known as the Enlightenment Gallery and houses a permanent exhibition about the Age of Enlightenment, opened to celebrate the museum's 250th anniversary in 2003.

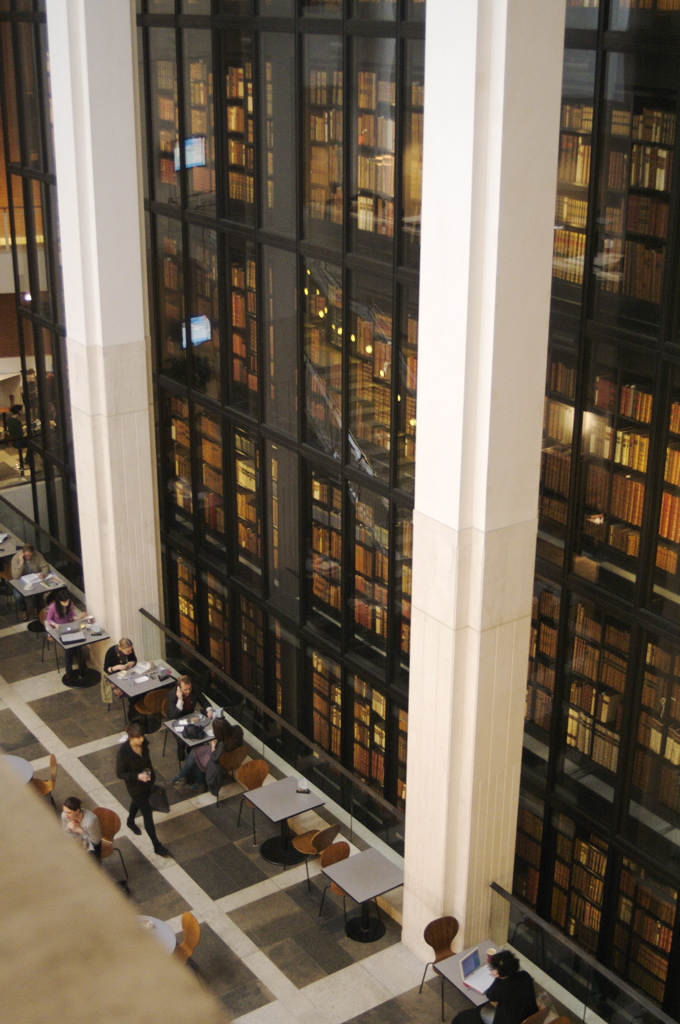
King's Library Tower, 2008

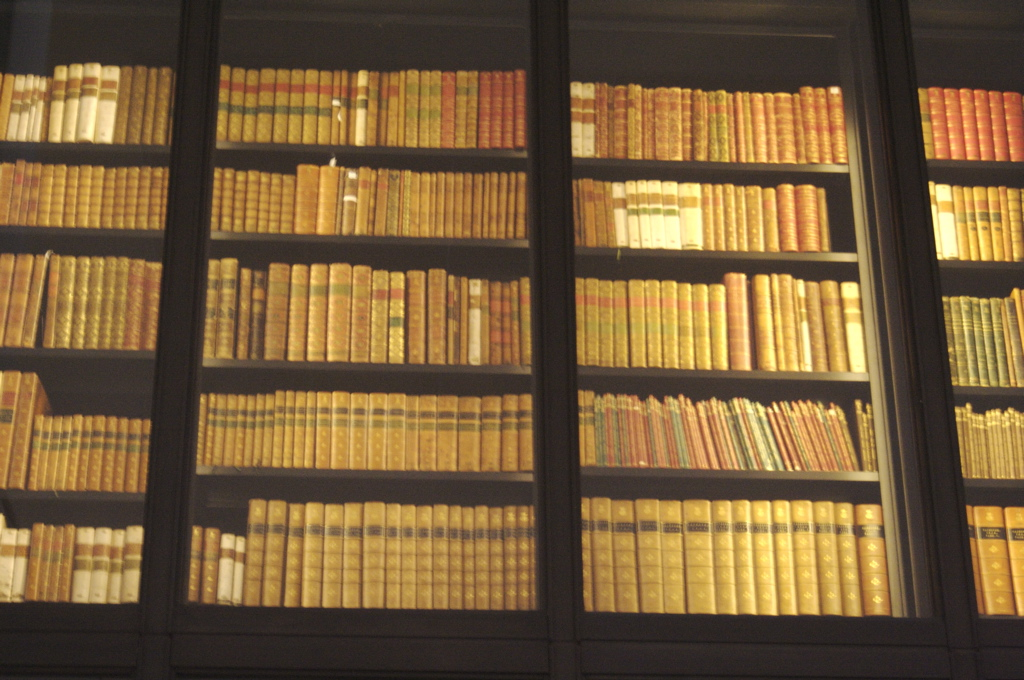
King's Library Tower, 2008

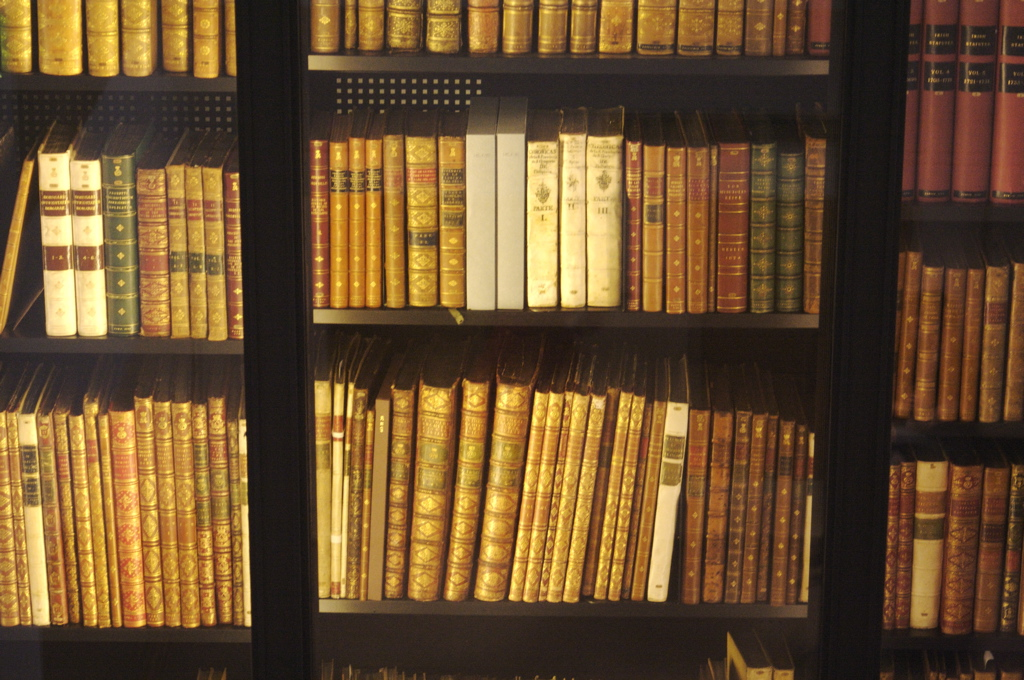
King's Library Tower, 2008

== Scope of the library ==
Historians agree that George III intended the library to be a comprehensive resource for scholars, rather than a collection of rare volumes or fine bindings. In other words, this was a working library rather than a showpiece, although it did contain some notable rarities. These include a Gutenberg Bible and many English incunabula, including a copy of Caxton's first edition of The Canterbury Tales. The purchase of Thorkelin's library meant that there was a notable collection of over 2,000 works on Scandinavian language and literature. The collection also includes the first four Shakespeare folios.

The oldest-known catalogue of the library was compiled in 1769. The Bibliothecae Regiae catalogus, a catalogue of works organised by author, was published in five volumes between 1820 and 1829, its compilation being overseen by Barnard. A hand-written subject catalogue also exists; work on this subject catalogue may have started in the 1790s, and it was kept updated through several subsequent decades. The library's pamphlets were catalogued for the first time following the Library's move to the British Museum.

In 1769 the library contained 11,200 printed titles, in 19,500 volumes. By the time it passed to the British Museum in 1827 it had grown to 65,000 printed volumes, as well as 17,500 pamphlets and 446 manuscripts; the manuscripts mainly date from the reign of George III and few are of particular note.

Analysis of the subject catalogue shows that as of 1820 44% of the titles in the library were concerned with history, and 16% were literature of various kinds. An extensive range of subjects was represented by smaller numbers of works. Recent literature was not particularly well represented, with, for instance, no works by Jane Austen being listed. It seems that library policy was only to collect novels once it was clear that the author in question had gained an enduring and positive reputation. 260 editions of the Bible were included, and works from other European countries were well represented. For instance, 57% of the history titles had been published outside Britain. There was a good selection of library catalogues from other collections, and runs of the official publications of Parliament. For an eighteenth-century library there was an unusually good selection of periodicals, although newspapers were not collected.

== See also ==
- King's manuscripts, British Library
- The Battle of the Books, a short satire written by Jonathan Swift in 1704, depicting a literal battle between books in the King's Library
