= Frederick Augusta Barnard =

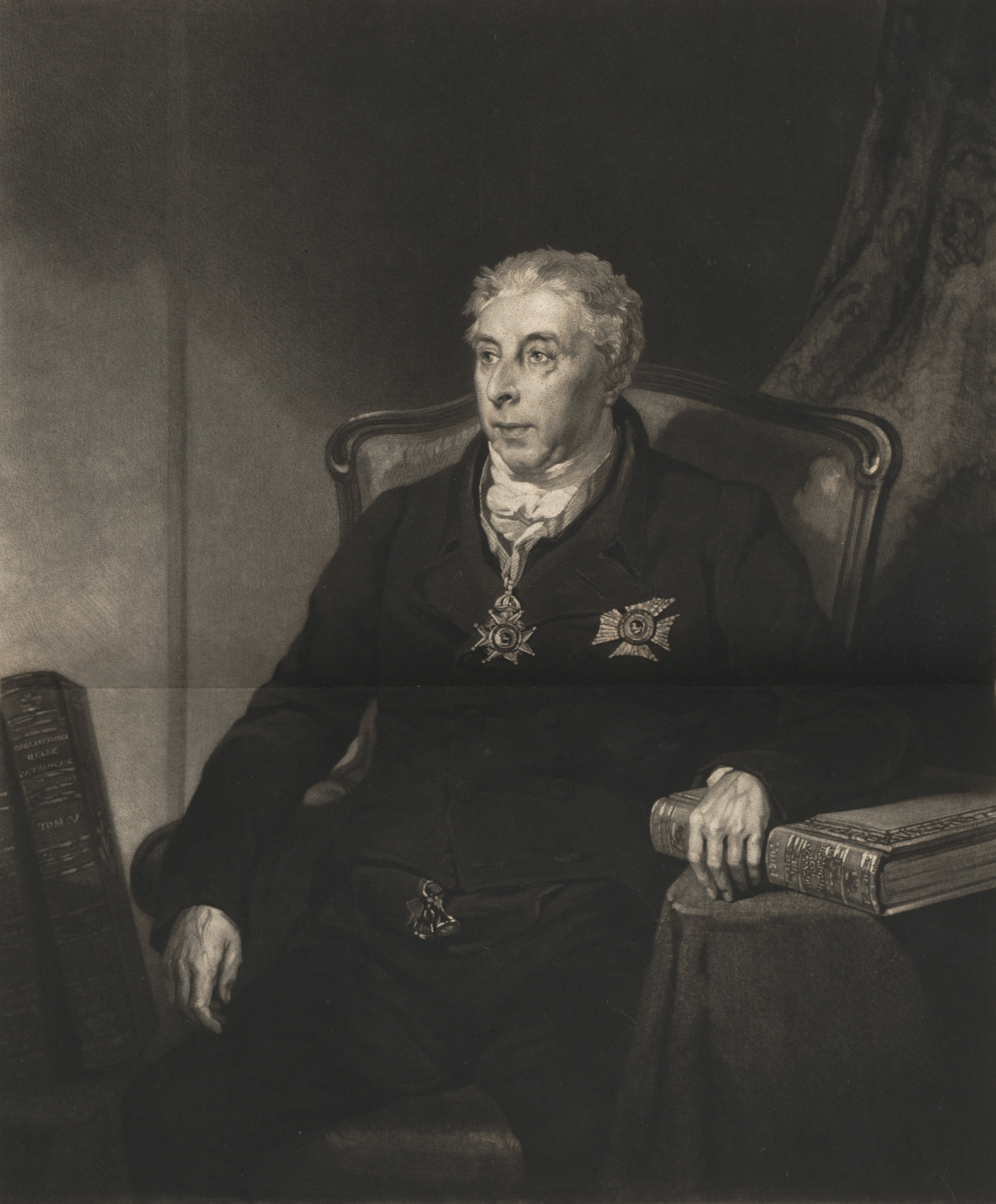
- Frederick Augusta Barnard by Samuel William Reynolds
- Born: September 1, 1743
- Died: January 27, 1830 (aged 86); London
- Occupation: Principal librarian to George III
- Years active: 1773-1830

Sir Frederick Augusta Barnard KCH FRS FSA (1 September 1743 – 27 January 1830) was principal librarian to George III during much of the British King's reign. Barnard developed the library collection systematically, seeking guidance from noted intellectuals including writer and lexicographer Dr. Samuel Johnson.

== Birth and parentage ==
Frederick Augusta Barnard was the son of John Barnard (†1773), a Gentleman Usher, Quarterly Waiter and Page of the Backstairs to Frederick, Prince of Wales. His mother was Elizabeth Smith, who had married John Barnard at Berwick Street Chapel, St James, Westminster, in 1740/1. Barnard was born 1 September 1743 and was baptised at St James, Westminster, 30 September 1743, and was almost certainly a godson of the Prince and his wife Princess Augusta of Saxe-Coburg.

When Barnard died (1830), The Gentleman's Magazine stated 'He was presumed to be a natural son of Frederick, Prince of Wales', a statement repeated in the same magazine in 1834, repeated in Edward Edwards, Lives of the founders of the British Museum (1870), page 468, and several subsequent reference works, and perpetuated by a descendant, the herald James Arnold Frere, in his The British Monarchy at home (1963), pages 42, 45 and 139.

The claim, not based on any earlier record, seems to have originated in the belief that Barnard was Prince Frederick's son by his mistress Anne Vane, the daughter of Lord Barnard, as has been stated by one genealogist, but since Anne died in 1736, that is not possible. That he was the son of John Barnard is proved by the latter's will, dated 2 April 1772, which quotes the terms of his marriage settlement, dated 26 June 1741, which made provision of £5,000 for his wife if she survived him, and then for her children. The will states 'whereas my late wife has departed this life leaving three children by her body by me (viz) the said Elizabeth Barnard and Frederick Augusta Barnard and Mary Barnard now all living". The will further mentions related orders of the Court of Chancery on 24 February 1762 when Samuel Wright was ordered to pay £5,000 to the Accountant General (John's wife Elizabeth having presumably died), and on 28 June 1768 when application was successfully made for the funds, all the children having attained their majorities. The £5,000 was then bequeathed to the three children, the son receiving less than the daughters, he "being happily provided for in his Majesty's service".

== Early career ==
Barnard's introduction to royal service was as Page of the Backstairs to George III, appointed to that post on 26 December 1760. By 1773 he was Librarian at Buckingham Palace, a post he held until 1830.

== The Royal Library ==
On George III's accession in 1760, he found a Royal Library of little substance since the Old Royal Library had been moved from St James's Palace in 1708, and donated to the new British Museum by George II in 1757. The library that George III inherited consisted of a few collections scattered among the various royal residences.

Early in his reign George determined to start a new library worthy of a monarch, and reflecting his patronage, taste and power. As a first step, he acquired in 1763 the library of Joseph Smith, former British Consul at Venice. Smith's collection contained many classics that were important examples of early printing. Starting around this period George delegated buyers to attend all major book sales in London and the Continent. Single volumes, private collections and large numbers of books from Jesuit libraries that had closed down, found their way to London and the new library.

George continued enlarging his library for some fifty years. He acquired the best books at the auctions of West, Ratcliffe and Askew, and continued buying up to the Roxburghe sale of 1812. Messrs Nicol, the booksellers, were his usual agents, though he retrieved from the Continent some priceless incunabula through Horn of Ratisbon, a notorious plunderer of the German convents.

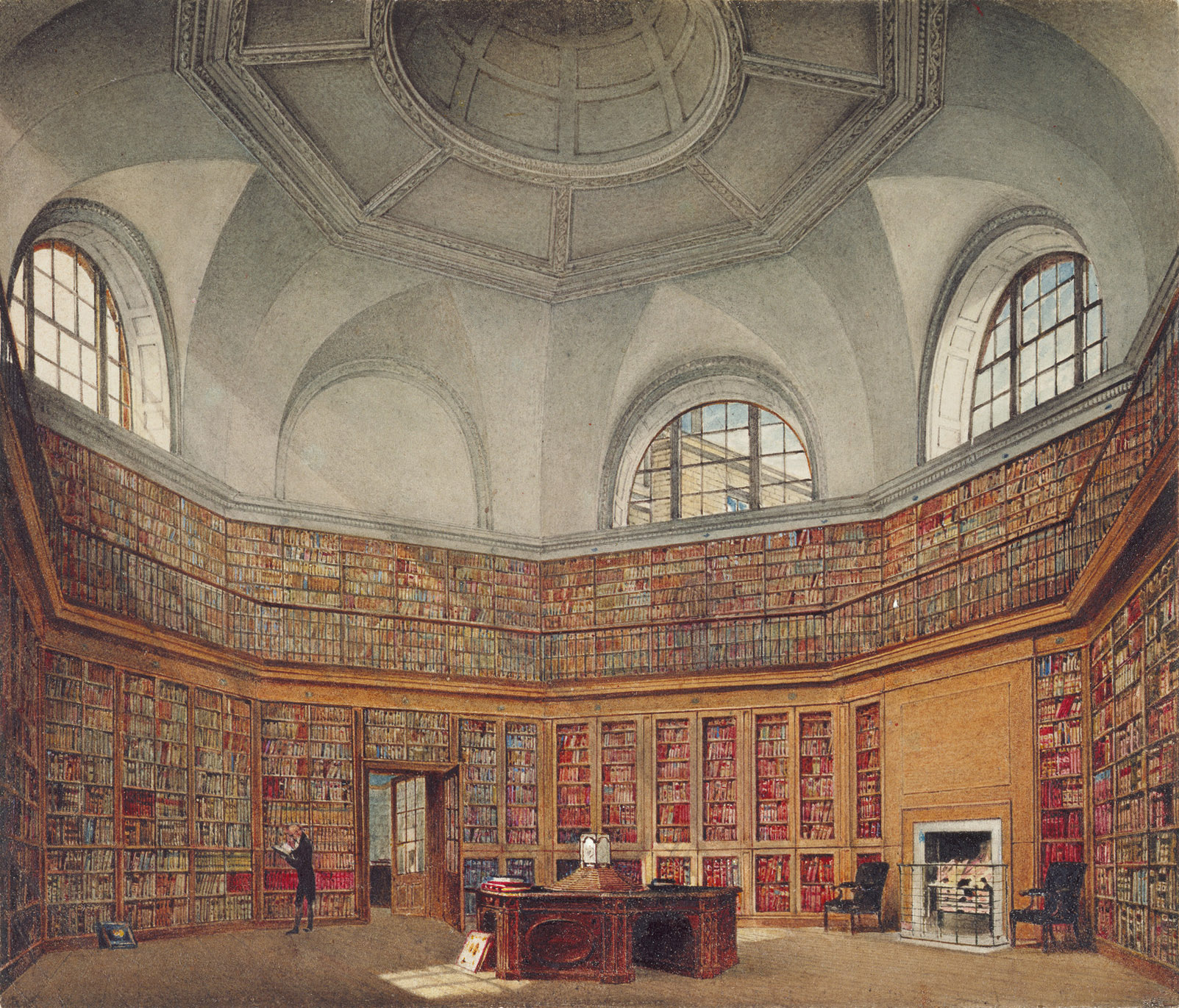
The Octagon Library, George III's original library at Buckingham House

This collection, which came to be known as the King's Library, held numerous volumes on classical, English and Italian literature, European history and religion, and had examples of early printing, including a copy of the Gutenberg Bible, and William Caxton's first edition of Chaucer's Canterbury Tales. The collection included less-scholarly material, such as current magazines and newspapers. Numerous manuscripts and bound volumes of maps and topographical views rounded off the collection. The library had grown to some 65 000 volumes and 19 000 pamphlets by the time of George's death (1820).

A policy was eventually instituted of making the library's resources freely available to scholars, but initially George regarded the collection as his personal property and only grudgingly allowed access to Joseph Priestley and the American revolutionary John Adams, though Samuel Johnson was always welcomed.

The collection was first housed in the Old Palace at Kew, then was moved to the Octagon Library which had been specially constructed at the Queen's House or Buckingham House, on the site of the present Buckingham Palace. Here it remained until George IV, after his father's death in 1820, decided to rebuild Buckingham House into a suitable palace for himself. George IV had little interest in the library, and he donated it to the British public in 1823.

== Catalogue ==
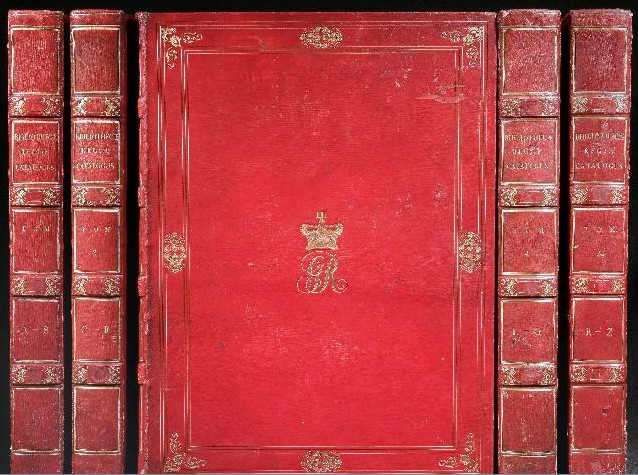
Bibliothecae Regiae Catalogus

For a long time George III had wanted a catalogue of the collection published, but kept postponing this. It became evident after 1812 that he would not recover from his condition, and Queen Charlotte and the Prince Regent urged that the catalogue be finalised. Barnard compiled and published it as Bibliothecae Regiae Catalogus printed by W. Bulmer & W. Nicol of London between 1820 and 1829 in five folio volumes. Although it was never offered for sale to the public, copies were presented to the crowned heads of Europe and important libraries in the United Kingdom and elsewhere.

== Later life ==
Barnard had been elected a Fellow of the Society of Antiquaries in 1789 and a Fellow of the Royal Society in 1790. He was distressed to witness the dispersal of the collection he had helped to assemble, but he was made Knight Commander of the Order of the Guelphs (Knight of Hanover, or K.C.H.) in 1828.

== Family ==
On 28 October 1776 Barnard married Catherine Byde, the daughter of John Byde at St. George Hanover Square, London. They had a son, George, and possibly a daughter. Catherine died in 1837.

Barnard lived for most of his working life in a Grace and favour apartment in St James's Palace and died there 27 January 1830, aged 87.

Barnard's will of 2 July 1827 mentions a house at Twickenham and named his wife as principal beneficiary, and also made provision for his grandson. Barnard was buried in a vault under St Martin-in-the-Fields, London, 3 February 1830, but he and his wife were removed to Kensal Green Cemetery, 1 February 1859.

Barnard's son, George (1777–1817) had a son, also named George, who died in 1846.

== Bibliography ==
- Most Curious, Splendid and Useful: the King's Library of George III, by Graham Jefcoate
- The King's Library, by EM Paintin (London, 1989). 32p
- The Library of King George III, by John Brooke. Yale University Library Gazette, vol. 52, no.1 (July 1977), pp. 33–45
- A History of the British Museum Library, 1753–1973, by PR Harris (London, 1998). 833p
