= Africa House, London =

Office block in London

Africa House
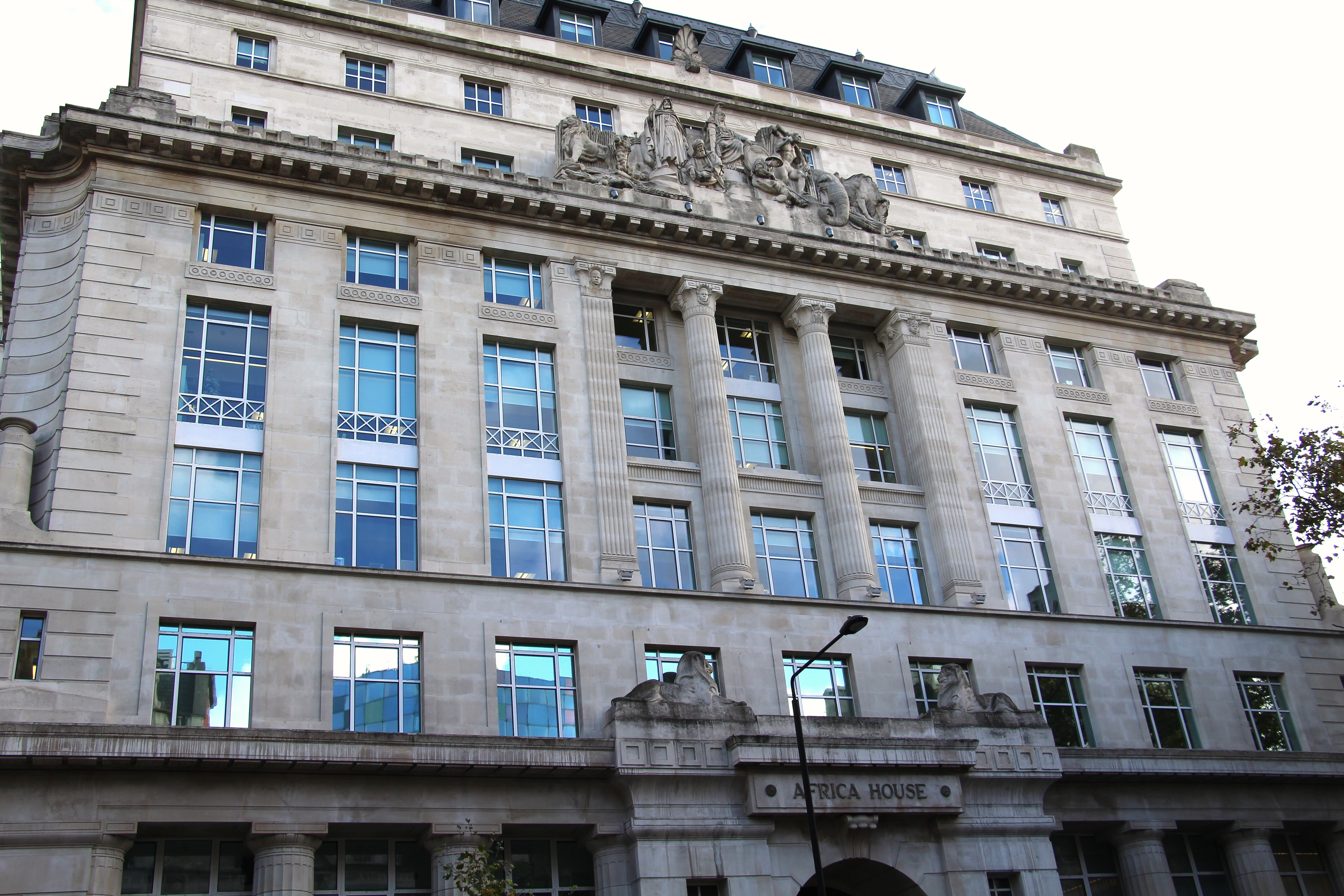
- Africa House
- Interactive map of the Africa House area

General information
- Type: Office
- Location: London, England
- Coordinates: 51°31′01″N 0°07′10″W
- Completed: 1922

Design and construction
- Architects: Trehearne & Norman

Listed Building – Grade II
- Official name: Africa House
- Designated: 11 December 1996
- Reference no.: 1379261

Africa House is a Grade II listed office block on Kingsway in London. Completed in 1922, it was one of the last buildings to be built along the Kingsway, a newly developed cut-through designed for the relief of traffic congestion which was opened in 1905.

== History ==
The building was designed by Trehearne and Norman with construction beginning in 1921. Completed in 1922, it was one of the last buildings to be built along the Kingsway, a newly developed cut-through designed for the relief of traffic congestion which was opened in 1905. Named after Edward VII, the reigning monarch, it is often considered the last great Victorian metropolitan improvement. The building was Grade II listed in 1996 and is part of the Kingsway conservation area.

== Design ==
The building displays a large facade of Portland stone with a robust Doric screen and large arched entrance. Nikolaus Pevsner in his architectural guides describes the building as having a "pompous, rather busy front". The screen is mounted by a pedestal of carved figures and animals Britannia with African workers and animals by Benjamin Clemens. John Webb Singer would provide ironwork, particularly in the gates.

== See also ==
- Carlisle House, Holborn
- Victoria House
- Aviation House
- Baptist Church House
- Victory House, Kingsway
