= Kodak House, London =

Office block in London, England

Kodak House
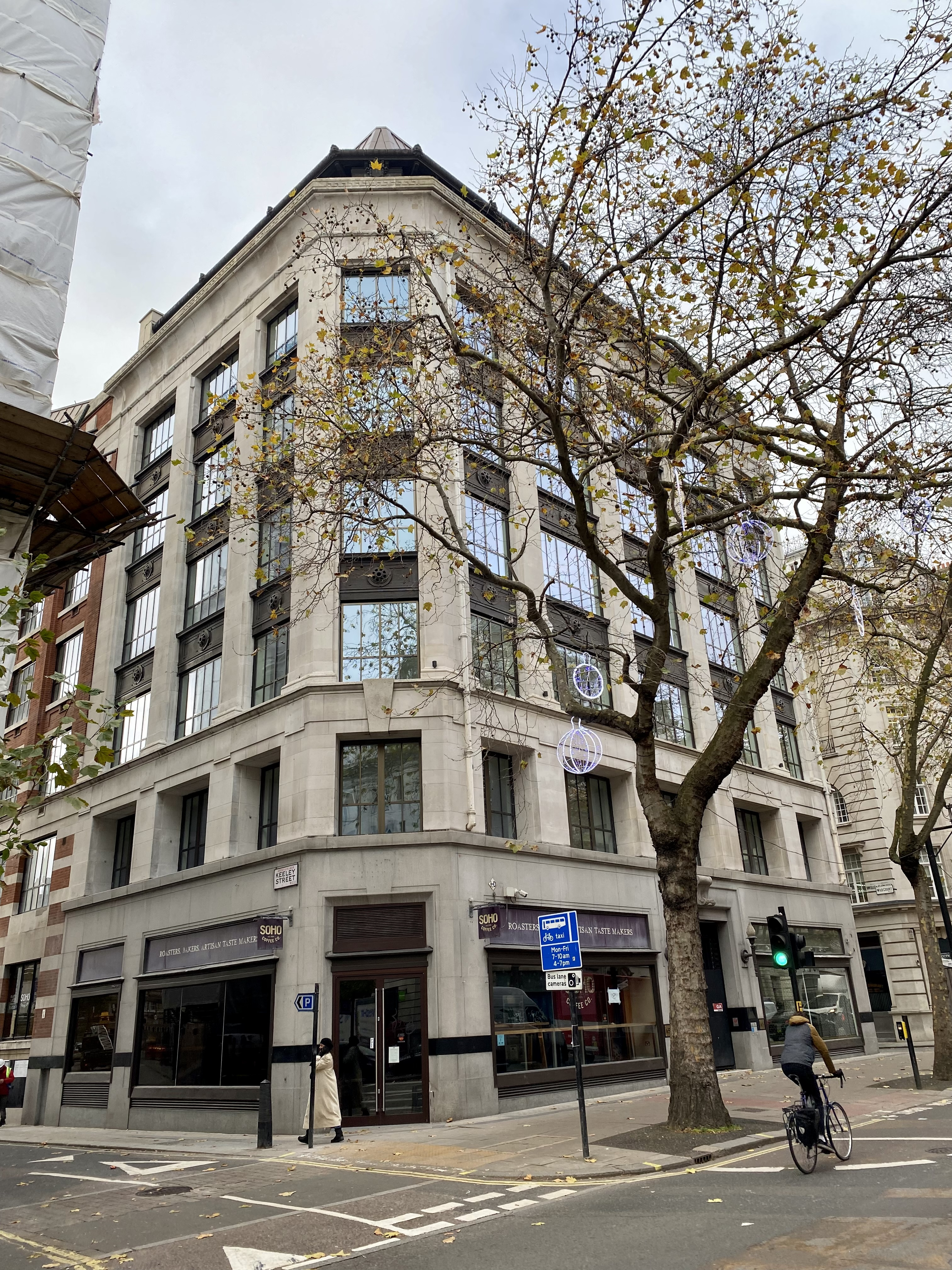
- Kodak House
- Interactive map of the Kodak House area

General information
- Type: Office
- Architectural style: Stripped Edwardian and Neoclassical
- Location: London, England
- Coordinates: 51°30′55″N 0°07′10″W
- Completed: 1911

Design and construction
- Architects: John James Burnet and Thomas S. Tait

Listed Building – Grade II
- Official name: Kodak House
- Designated: 09 September 1971
- Reference no.: 1379260

Kodak House is a Grade II listed office block on Kingsway in London. It is one of a number of office blocks built along the road in this period, but is unique for its modern design language, presenting an un-ornamented utilitarian facade. Its style has been described as stripped neo-classical.

== History ==
The block was constructed as one of many along Kingsway, alongside Aldwych, a work of metropolitan improvement aimed to relieve congestion. Multiple grand offices were built along the new avenue such as Victory House opposite.

The building was designed as the European headquarters for the Kodak company, completed in 1911 by Sir John Burnet and Partners, with Thomas Tait as architect. It was later owned in 1982 by Gallagher's, the tobacco manufacturer.

The building underwent refurbishment completing in March 2023, and has subsequently been branded as "The Kodak".

== Design ==
The building's design made used of steel-frames, a relatively new technique, and is considered the first within London to readily display them on an exceptionally simple facade. It is also unique among the blocks along the Kingsway and Aldwych in this regard. The rest of the facade is built in Portland stone. Despite many of the later buildings completed into and after the First World War, they retain a decorated Edwardian style in their design.

Nikolaus Pevsner would describe Kodak House as "the only building of architectural importance in Kingsway. For here is an early example in London of that straightforward treatment of a commercial building to which the future belonged".

== See also ==
- Victory House
- Africa House, London
