= Baptist Church House =

Edwardian former office block in London

Baptist Church House and Kingsgate House
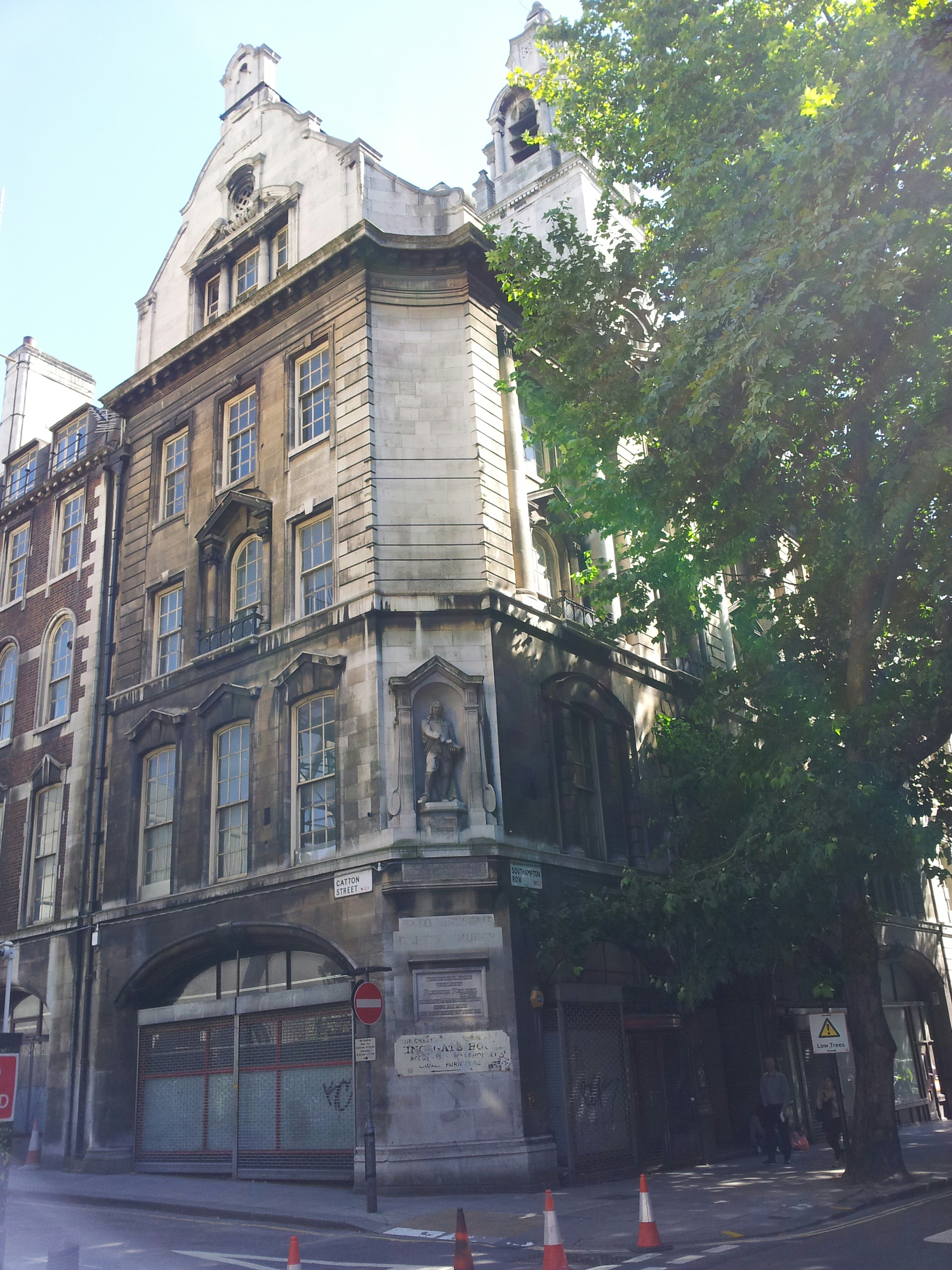
- Baptist Church House

General information
- Type: Originally office now a hotel
- Architectural style: Edwardian
- Location: London, England
- Coordinates: 51°31′05″N 0°07′12″W
- Completed: 1903

Design and construction
- Architect: Arthur Keen

Listed Building – Grade II*
- Official name: Baptist Church House Kingsgate House
- Designated: 15 February 1982
- Reference no.: 1378782

Baptist Church House with Kingsgate House is a Grade II* listed Edwardian office block on Southampton Row.

== History ==
The building is one of a number of large Edwardian blocks constructed following the widening of Southampton Row where it joins the Kingsway. It was built as the headquarters of the Baptist Union with Arthur Keen as architect, with construction concluding in 1903. Richard Garbe would produce a sculpture of John Bunyan for the building with Derwent Wood also providing a statue of Charles Spurgeon and Laurence Turner modelling the ceilings. Restoration work was carried out in 1946.

First listed in 1995, the building would be noted as "heritage at risk" in 2010 despite permission granted for a redevelopment. A conversion was finally completed between 2017 and 2018 with the building transformed into a hotel. It is also part of the Kingsway conservation area.

== Design ==
The building is of an Edwardian Baroque or "Wrenaissance" design. The gables and stacks of the roof-line demonstrate Keen's inspiration from Richard Norman Shaw whom he studied under.

== See also ==
- Carlisle House, Holborn
- Victoria House
- Aviation House
- Victory House, Kingsway
