= Victory House, Kingsway =

Edwardian former office block in London

Coordinates: 51.515704°N 0.118921°W

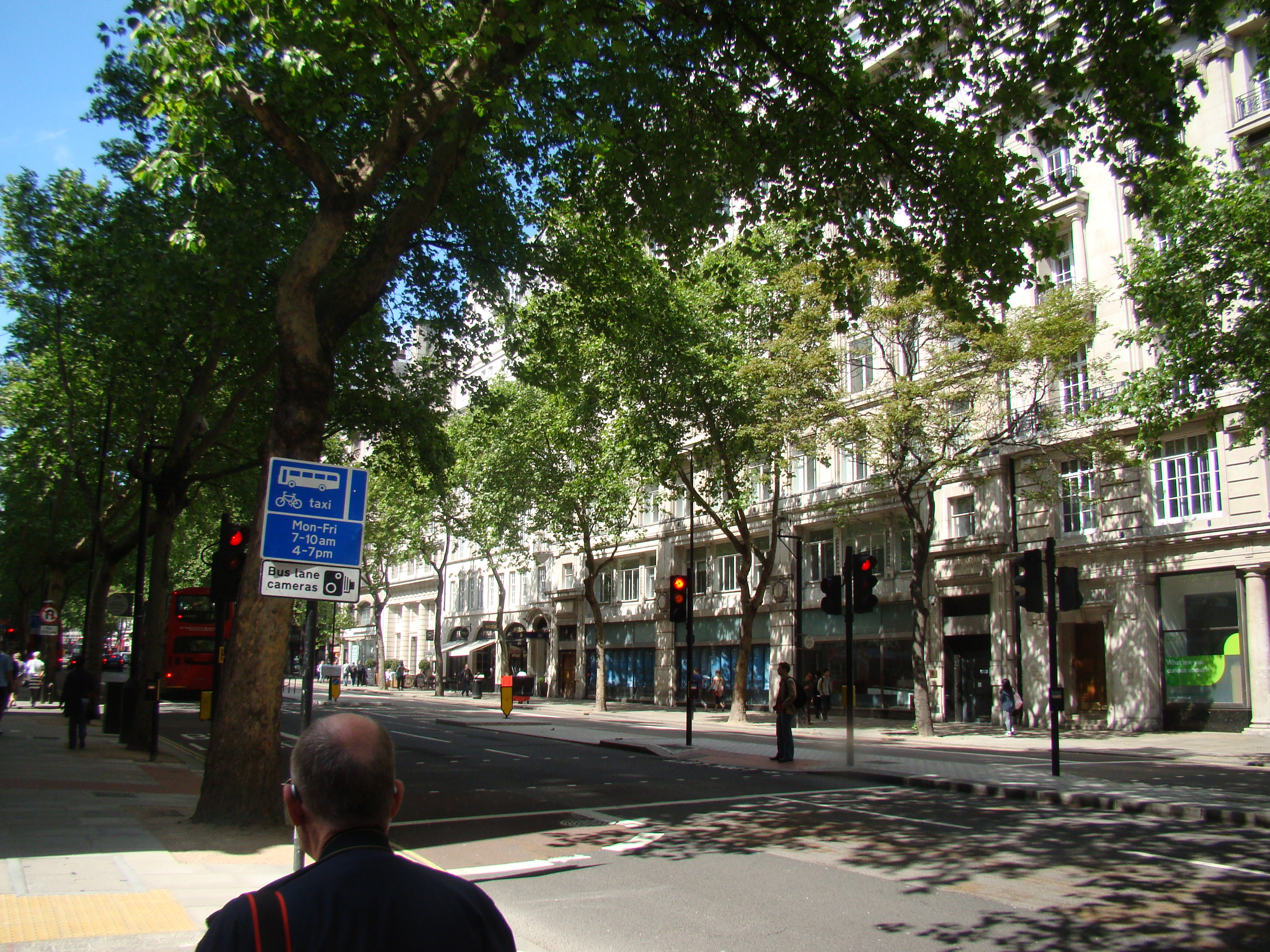
Victory House (right centre) obscured by trees

Victory House is an Edwardian style office block on Kingsway in London.

The block is one of many Edwardian style offices built along the Kingsway, a road opened in 1905 for traffic relief. Designed by Trehearne & Norman, it was built between 1919 and 1920. They are described by Nikolaus Pevsner in his architectural guides as "another confused front by Trehearne & Norman" in relation to Africa House up the road. The building is part of the Kingsway conservation area.

In 2025 Whitbread acquired the building, planning to convert it into a hub by Premier Inn.

== See also ==
- Carlisle House, Holborn
- Aviation House
- Baptist Church House
- Africa House
