= Carlisle House, Holborn =

Mansion block development in London

Carlisle House
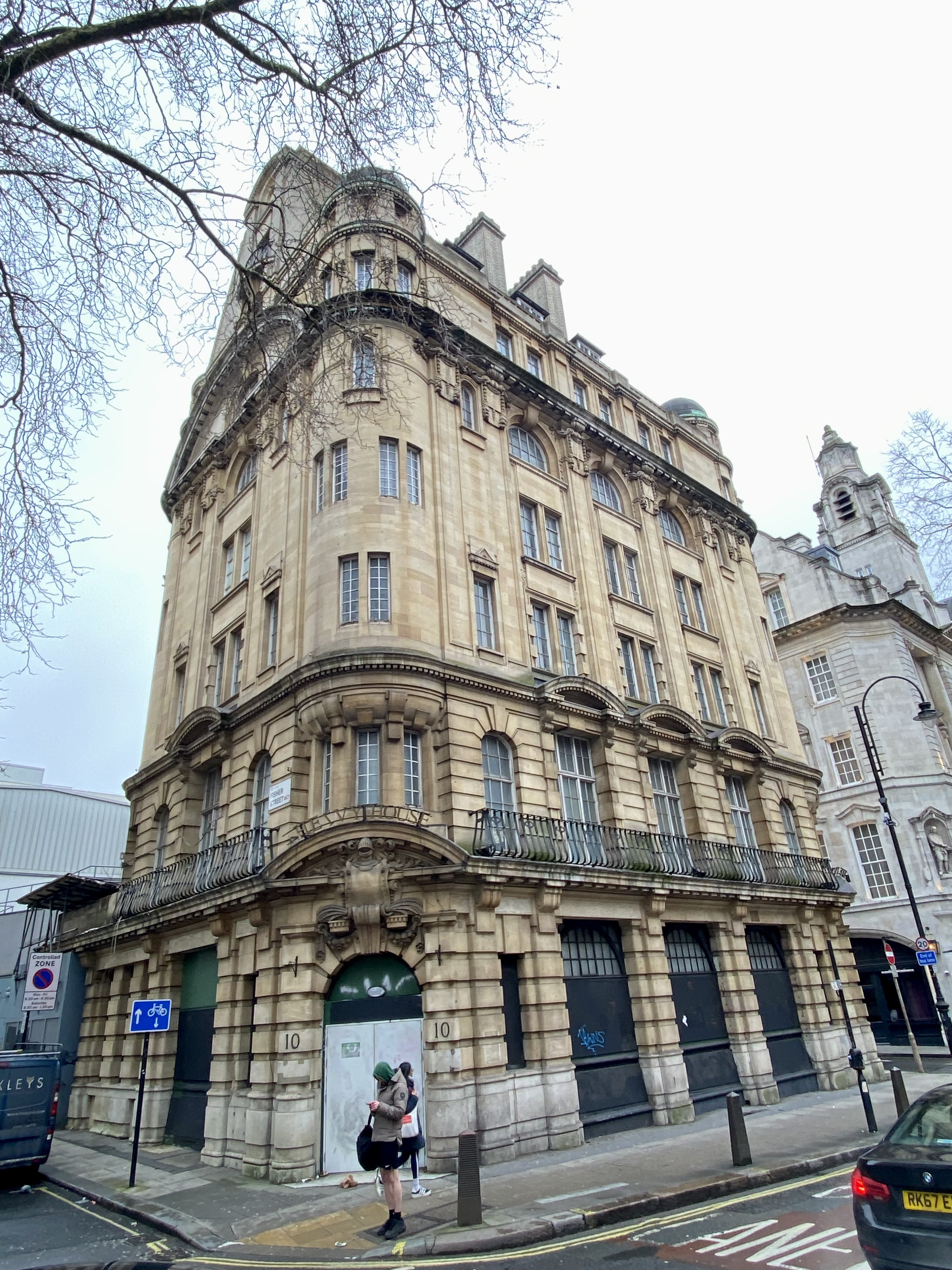
- Carlisle House
- Interactive map of the Carlisle House area

General information
- Type: Originally offices and hotel, now offices and shop
- Architectural style: Edwardian
- Location: London, England
- Coordinates: 51°31′06″N 0°07′13″W
- Completed: 1906

Design and construction
- Architect: Bradshaw Gass & Hope

Listed Building – Grade II
- Official name: Carlisle House
- Designated: 05 May 1988
- Reference no.: 1378785

Carlisle House is a Grade II listed Edwardian office block on Southampton Row.

== History ==
The building Edwardian in character, reflecting that of many of the blocks at the south of Southampton Row, widened in the early 20th century as a continuation of the Kingsway. It was designed by Bradshaw Gass & Hope and built between 1905 and 1906, an early example in London of a building using steel frames.

The building was listed in 1988 and is part of the Kingsway conservation area.

== See also ==
- Baptist Church House
- Victoria House
- Victory House, Kingsway
