= Arthur Keen =

Arthur Keen may refer to:

- Arthur Keen (architect) (1861–1938), British architect
- Arthur Keen (businessman) (1835–1915), British entrepreneur, the Keen of engineering firm Guest, Keen and Nettlefolds
- Arthur Keen (RAF officer) (1895–1918), British World War I flying ace
