= Benjamin Clemens =

English sculptor (1875–1957)

Benjamin Clemens (5 October 1875 – 27 December 1957) was a 20th-century sculptor who worked in London.

== Early life ==
Clemens was born in Dalston, North London, the son of Richard Clemens, a salesman and warehouse worker originally from Cornwall. He received some schooling at Lonsbury College at Hackney Downs but at the age of 15 was working as a haberdasher's assistant. By his mid-twenties he was studying art, first at the North London School of Drawing and then at the Royal College of Art. Clemens submitted works to the British Institution's student competition, and his talent was recognized with a two-year scholarship in sculpture paying £50 a year and inclusion in the associated exhibition at the Tate Museum.

After his studies at the Royal College of Art Clemens was appointed assistant master under Professor Édouard Lantéri. He exhibited his sculpture regularly in major British exhibitions, including the Royal Academy's Annual Exhibition, where The Collector and Art Critic rated his entry one of only eight works of merit among 180 sculptures in the 1906 show.

In 1910 he showed Eurydice at Twenty Years of British Art at the Whitechapel Gallery.

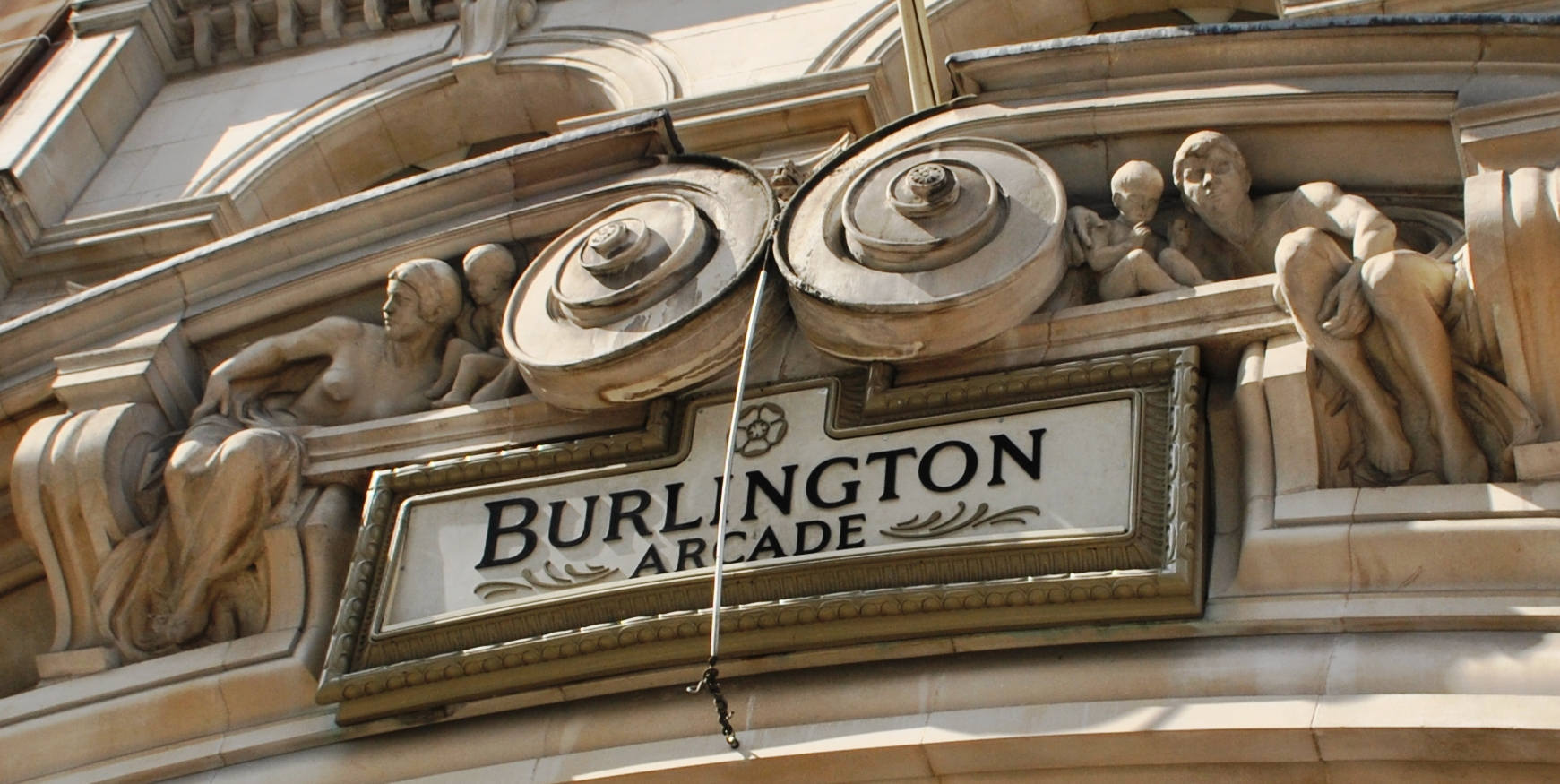
Clemens carved these figures for the new Piccadilly façade of the Burlington Arcade in 1911.

== First World War ==
At the outbreak of the First World War Clemens was 38. He served first with the British Expeditionary Force and later with the Royal Army Medical Corps. Following the war, Lieutenant-Colonel F.S. Brereton organized exhibitions by artists who had served in the RAMC. The first, in April 1919, was at Army Medical War Museum, at 76 Fulham Road, London. A reviewer for the British Medical Journal thought Clemens's plaster casts of the head of An Orderly, The Pick-a-back and the Camel-Cacolet amply repaid the visitor's attention. Clemens also exhibited at a 1920 show by RAMC artists organised by Brereton at the Imperial War Museum. The museum then purchased two small bronzes—The St John's Ambulance Bearers (1919) and the VAD Worker (1920) for its permanent collection. (Note: The St John's Ambulance Bearers was photographed in the IWM collection by Andrew Douglas in the late 1970s. This image was then selected by the record label Polydor for the cover of The Jam's 1979 album Setting Sons. The sculpture was removed from public display in 1997.)

Clemens's wartime experience also informed his work for various war memorials commissioned after the end of the conflict. A design of his for a memorial for a burial ground in France was shown at the Victoria and Albert Museum's July 1919 exhibition of war memorials.

In 1921, he collaborated with fellow RCA professor Arthur Beresford Pite on a war memorial for Cheadle Hulme, Cheshire, with Pite designing the Early English-style stone cross and Clemens sculpting bronze figures of a soldier and sailor mounted high on the sides. The same year, Pite also designed the war memorial at Harrow for which Clemens sculpted four figures.

In 1922, Clemens was commissioned by the British Military Nurses Memorial Committee to create a statue for St Paul's Cathedral titled Bombed. The cathedral did not accept the statue due to lack of space.

== Post-WWI career ==
Clemens was one of several British artists to create lions for the 1924 British Empire Exhibition at Wembley. While Frederick Charles Herrick created a distinctly art deco lion for the exhibition's official symbol as did Percy Metcalfe for the exhibition medal, Clemens chose a more subdued approach for the six seated lions he sculpted in concrete for the Government Pavilion, taking a middle path between realism and art deco stylisation. New York's Art News described them as having been "treated with a formal restraint and severity that is wholly excellent". As Clemens's lions fronted the portico of the popular Government Building, they were a popular element in photographs and postcards from the exhibition. Two of these lions are now preserved at the entrance to Woburn Safari Park.

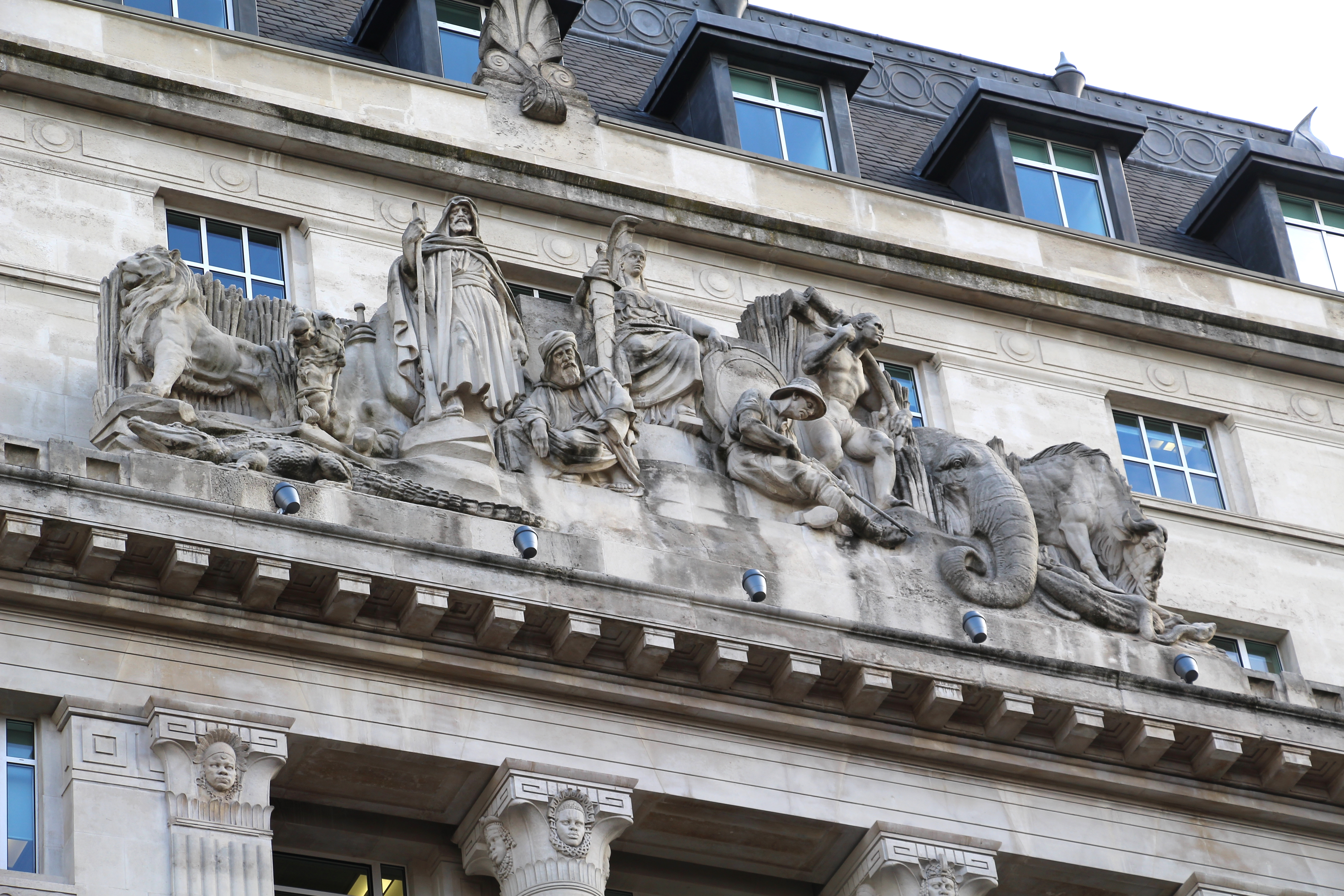
Clemens's frieze above the cornice of Africa House, London, has Britannia at its centre, flanked by noble Arab traders with their camels and a big game hunter oiling his rifle.

Clemens often produced monumental works in stone to fulfill commissions as part of major British construction projects of the early 20th century. During his life Clemens regularly exhibited at the Royal Academy of Art. His works were also often exhibited internationally including in Paris, Rome, Brussels and the United States.

He was appointed an honorary member of the Royal Society of British Sculptors in 1946.

After Clemens's death on 27 December 1957, his former student Gilbert Ledward wrote an obituary for The Times describing how Clemens's "own career was sacrificed in order to teach and he never received the recognition he deserved".

== Selected works ==
=== Free-standing sculpture ===
- Works for the coronation of King Edward VII and Queen Alexandra (1902)
- The St John's Ambulance Bearers, bronze (1919)
- VAD Worker, bronze (1920)
- Hunters (1921, 1923)
- Sapho (c. 1921)
- Neme me impune lacessit (1924)
- The Knight (1926)
- Miserere mei Deus (1926)
- Remembrance (c. 1929)
- The Archer (c. 1931)
- Lion (c. 1931)
- The Blessing (1933)
- The Beggar (1933)
- Life (c. 1935)
- Andromeda (1938)
- Eurydice (1939)
- Work for St Paul's, Vicarage Gate, Kensington (Note: Gutted by firebombing during World War II and not rebuilt.)
- Completion of a bronze and ebony mace designed by George Kruger Gray for Westminster Abbey (1945), following Kruger Gray's death

=== Architectural stone-carving, concrete and bronze ===
- Carvings over the Piccadilly entrance to the Burlington Arcade, London, stone (1911)
- Frieze above cornice at Africa House, 70 Kingsway, London, stone (1922)
- Six seated lions in front of the Government Pavilion at the British Empire Exhibition at Wembley. concrete (1924)
- Sculpture at Mary Sumner House, Tufton Street, London, the headquarters of the Mothers' Union (1925)
- Sculptures of a boy and girl flanking a window above the new outpatients' entrance to the Royal National Orthopaedic Hospital in Bolsover Street, London, stone (1927) (Note: After the 2010 demolition of the Bolsover Street buildings, these figures were remounted over the entrance to the Royal National Orthopaedic Hospital's new Greenwell Street location.)
- Sculpture at County Hall, Nottinghamshire (1939)
- Sculpture for War Memorials:Cheadle Hulme, Cheshire, Harrow, London, Men of Canterbury Memorial, Kent,

== Sources ==
- "Benjamin Clemens". Mapping the Practice and Profession of Sculpture in Britain and Ireland 1851–1951. University of Glasgow History of Art and HATII. 2011.
- "British Institution Scholarship Fund". The Standard. London. 27 July 1900. p. 4.
- Catalogue of the War Memorials Exhibition—1919. Victoria and Albert Museum. July 1919.
- "The Exhibition of the Royal Academy of Arts—1906. The One Hundred and Thirty-Eighth.", The Collector and Art Critic, 4 (11): 303–305, September 1906, JSTOR 25435735
- Fell, Alison S. (31 July 2018). Women as Veterans in Britain and France after the First World War. Cambridge University Press. ISBN 9781108673136.
- Ledward, Gilbert (7 January 1958). "Obituary: Benjamin Clemens". The Times. No. 54042. p. 11.
- "The Lions of Wembley". Brent Museum and Archives. 22 July 2014.
- Martin, Gavin (13 January 2009). "Bring the Jam's Setting Sons sculpture back on display". The Guardian.
- "The Medical War Museum", The British Medical Journal, 1 (3042): 495, 19 April 1919, JSTOR 20337416
- Wyke, Terry; Cocks, Harry (2004). Public Sculpture of Greater Manchester. Liverpool University Press. ISBN 9780853235675.
- "The Triumph of Wembley—1924", The Art News, 22 (34), New York: 7–14, 31 May 1924, JSTOR 25591423
- Twenty Years of British Art (1890–1910): May 10–June 19, Whitechapel Art Gallery. [Whitechapel (London, Eng.) : The Gallery]. 1910.
