= Richard Garbe =

English sculptor

Richard Louis Garbe RA FRBS (26 October 1876 – 28 July 1957) was a British sculptor.

Richard Louis Garbe was born in Dalston, London, on 26 October 1876, with a twin Franz Paul Garbe (1876–1954). He had been christened Louis Richard, but was known as Richard. His father was Gustave Garbe (1850–1919), a Prussian ivory carver. Richard studied at the Central School of Arts and Crafts as well as learning his father's trade. In 1892 and 1893 he was awarded prizes for his wood carvings by the Turners Company at their annual exhibition at the Mansion House.

He taught at Central School of Arts and Crafts (1899–1929) and was also Head of Sculpture at the Royal College of Art (1926–1946). He was elected an Academician at the Royal Academy of Arts in 1929 and full Academician in 1936. He exhibited regularly at the Royal Academy Summer Exhibition from 1898 to 1957. In 1929 he was elected a Fellow of the Royal British Society of Sculptors, while in 1938 he was elected as the Master of the Art Workers' Guild.

His work is in many major collections, including the Tate. In the 1930s he produced ceramic sculptures for Royal Doulton.

Some of his major architectural work was Medieval Age and Modern Age for National Museum Cardiff, and in London his sculptures are on Five Kings House (formerly Thames House) by Southwark Bridge.

In 1908 he married Gertrude Julia Sabey (1879–1966) in Barnet. He had lived in Hornchurch and died on 28 July 1957 at Milton Way House, Westcott, Surrey, where he had lived from about 1933.

== Works Exhibited at the Royal Academy ==
Year	Title	Type
1898	Memories	Bust
1899	Portrait of a child	Bust
1901	L'inconnue	Head; marble
1902	A song to passing summer	Panel; ivory
1904	Serenite	Relief; marble
1905	Echo and Narcissus	Group; bronze
1906	Der Selbstsuchtiger	Statue
1907	Man and the ideal	Group
1908	The idealist	Group
1909	Undine	Statuette
1910	Man and the masks	Statue
1911	The Egoist	Statuette; bronze
1911	The voice of the past	Relief
1912	The Magdalenes	Group
1913	Adolescence	Statue
1914	Mother and child	Group
1915	Youth and the shadow	Relief

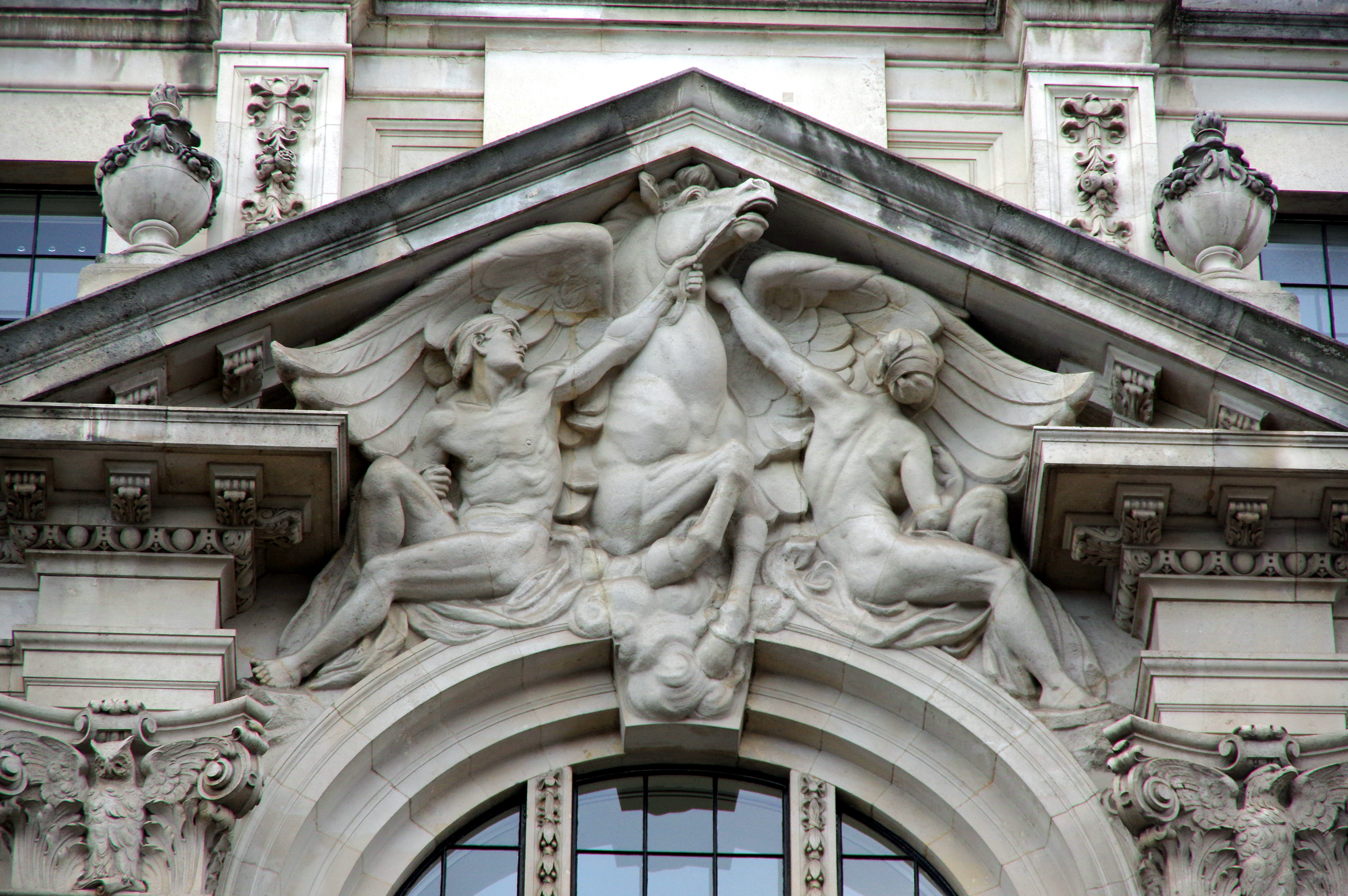
Five Kings House, London

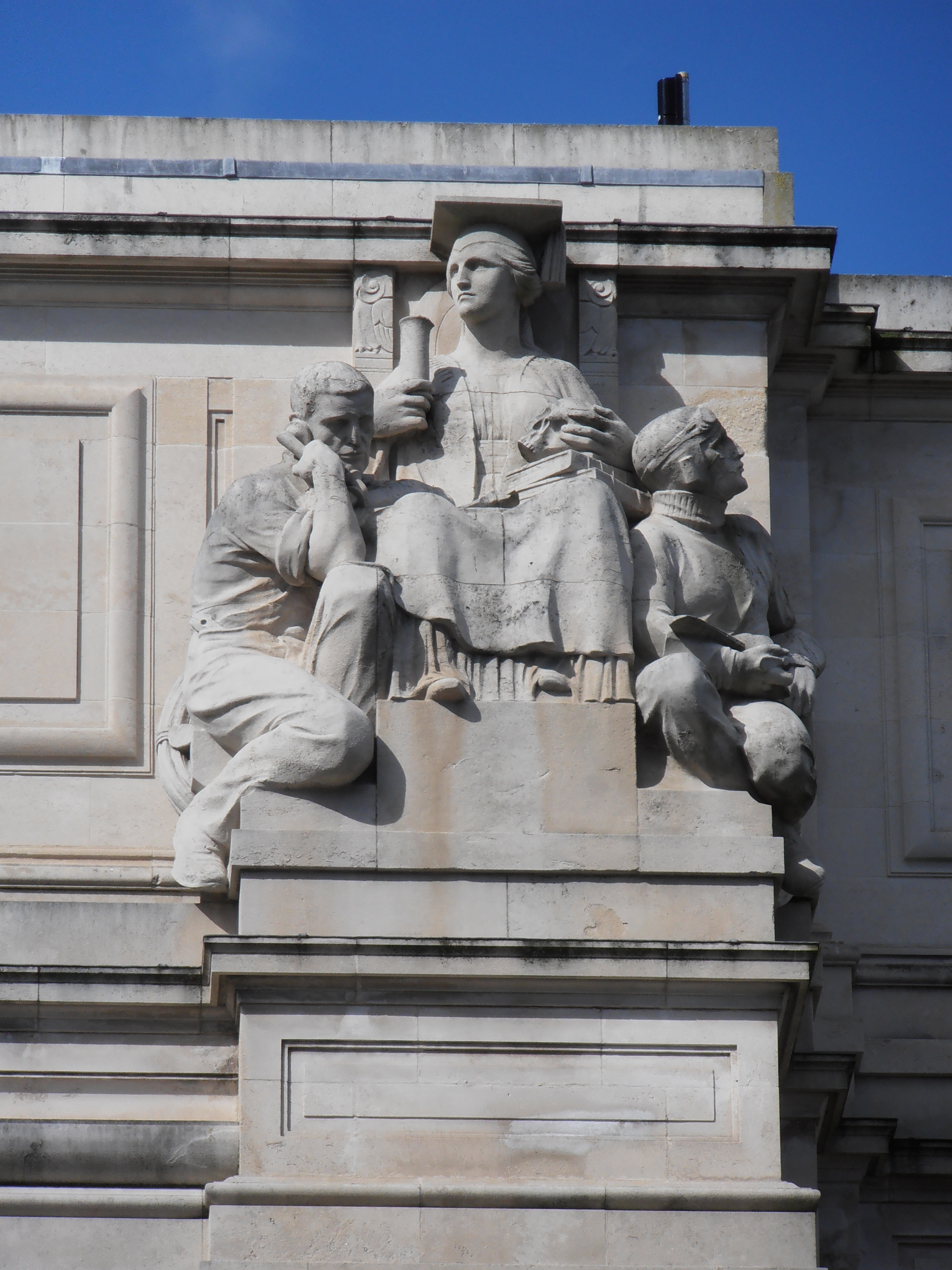
National Museum Cardiff

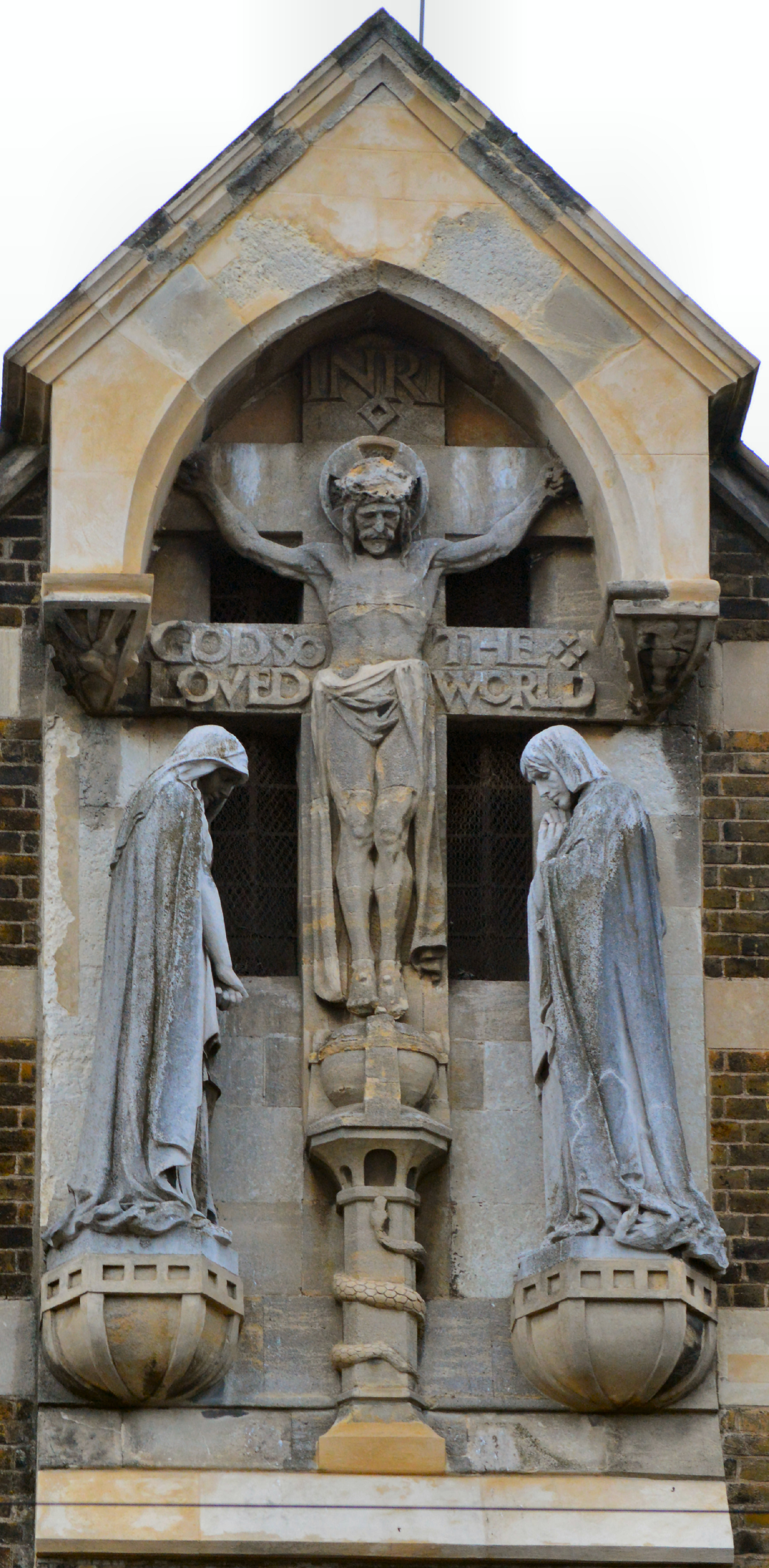
St John the Divine, Richmond

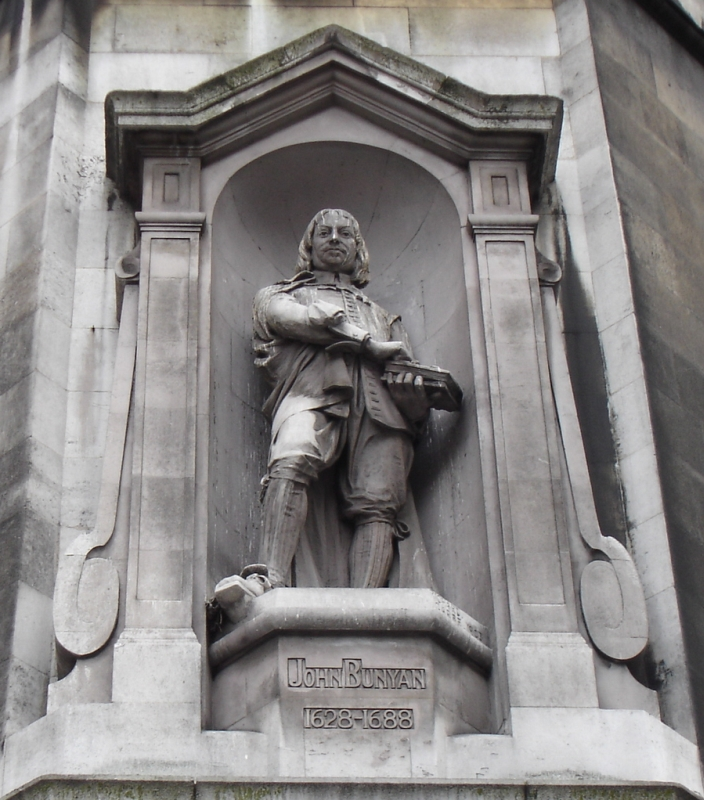
Baptist Church House, London
