= Five Kings House =

Building in London

Coordinates: 51°30′38″N 0°05′36″W

Five Kings House (formerly Thames House) is an office building in the City of London on the corner of Upper Thames Street and Queen Street Place, postcode EC4R 1QS. It is Grade II listed, Number:1358918.

It was built in 1911 by Thomas Collcutt and Stanley Hamp for Liebig's Extract of Meat Company.

The façade contains architectural sculptures by Richard Garbe. The figures representing Abundance over the central entrance are by Frank Lynn Jenkins.

Over the corner doorway is a canopy decorated with reclining figures, a skull on a pediment and a tablet with cherubs.

Those over the grand entrance on the corner with Upper Thames Street represent Mercury and a female figure by George Duncan MacDougald (1880–1945). Above this is a relief of Pegasus with two male figures and capitals with an owl and eagle.

The central Queen Street doorway has crouched figures in a canopy and cherubs above.

The former doorway to the south has figures in lead. The upper pediment has naked reclining figures with a child above. The winged keystone is decorated with fruit and eagles. The doorway has an Atlas keystone with an owl motif above. In the spandrels are reliefs of two naked female figures. A bronze sailing ship is in front of the oculus, supported on cartouche with the inscription "THAMES HOUSE".

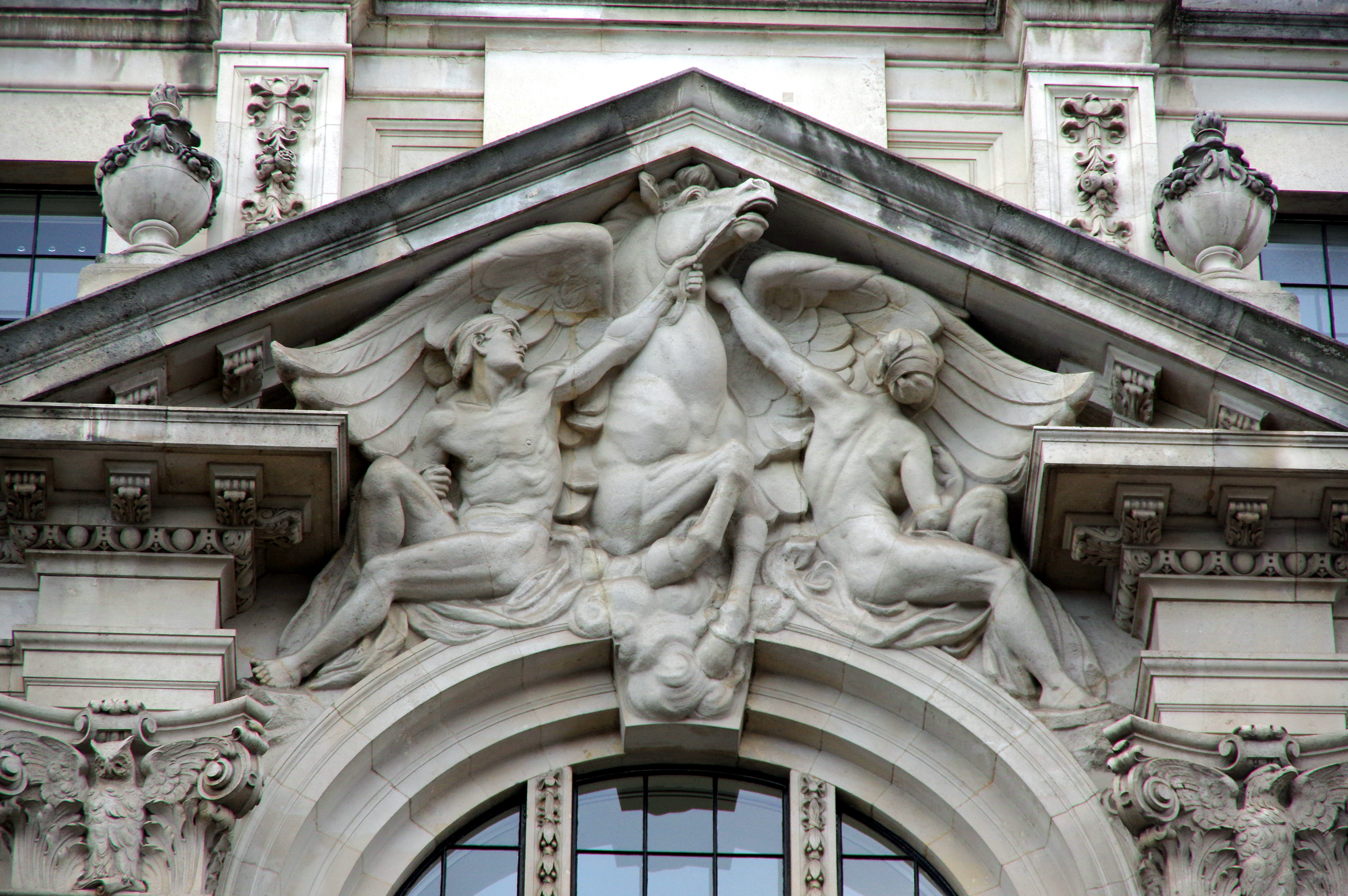
Nude figures restraining Pegasus

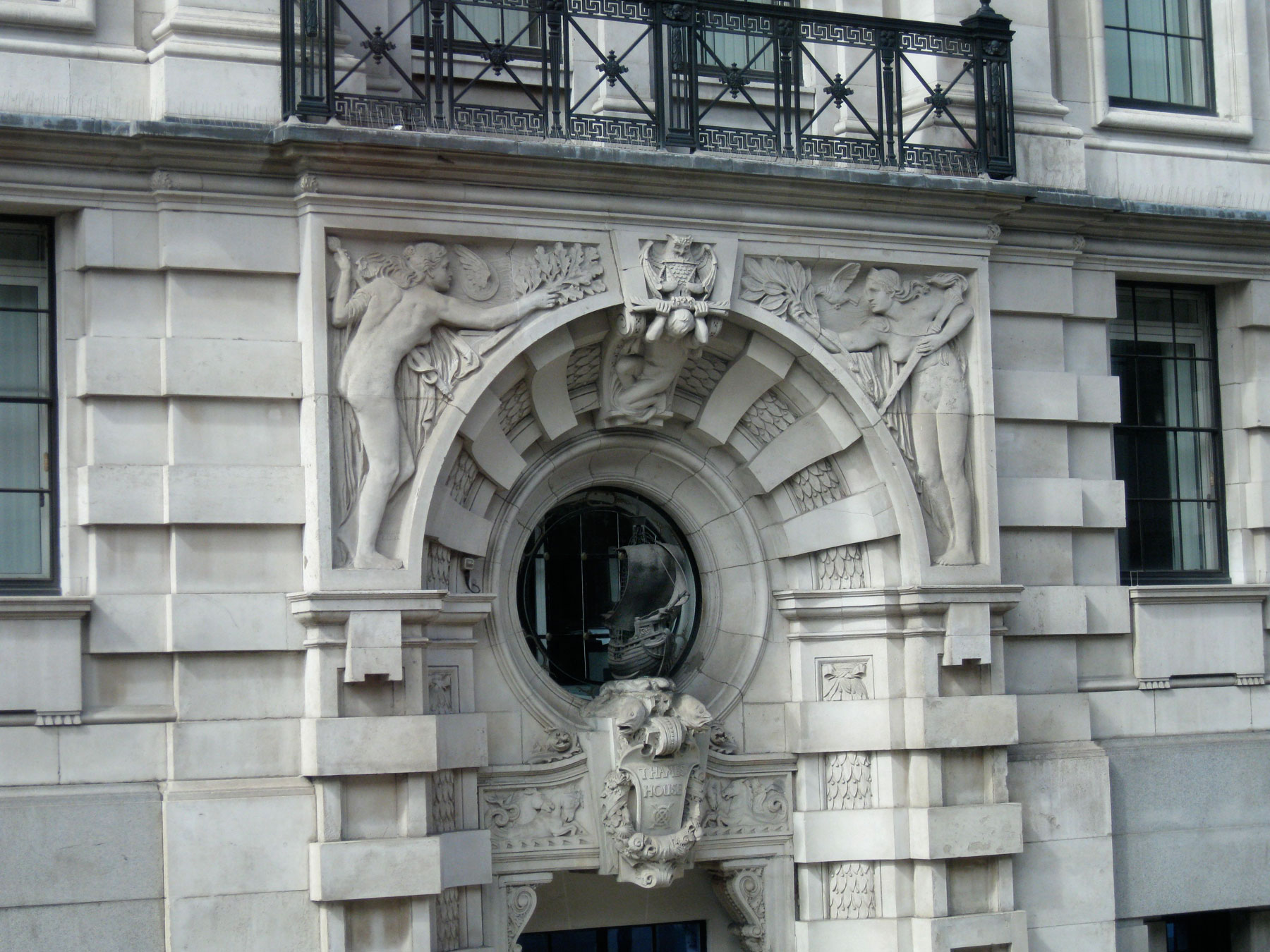
Entrance

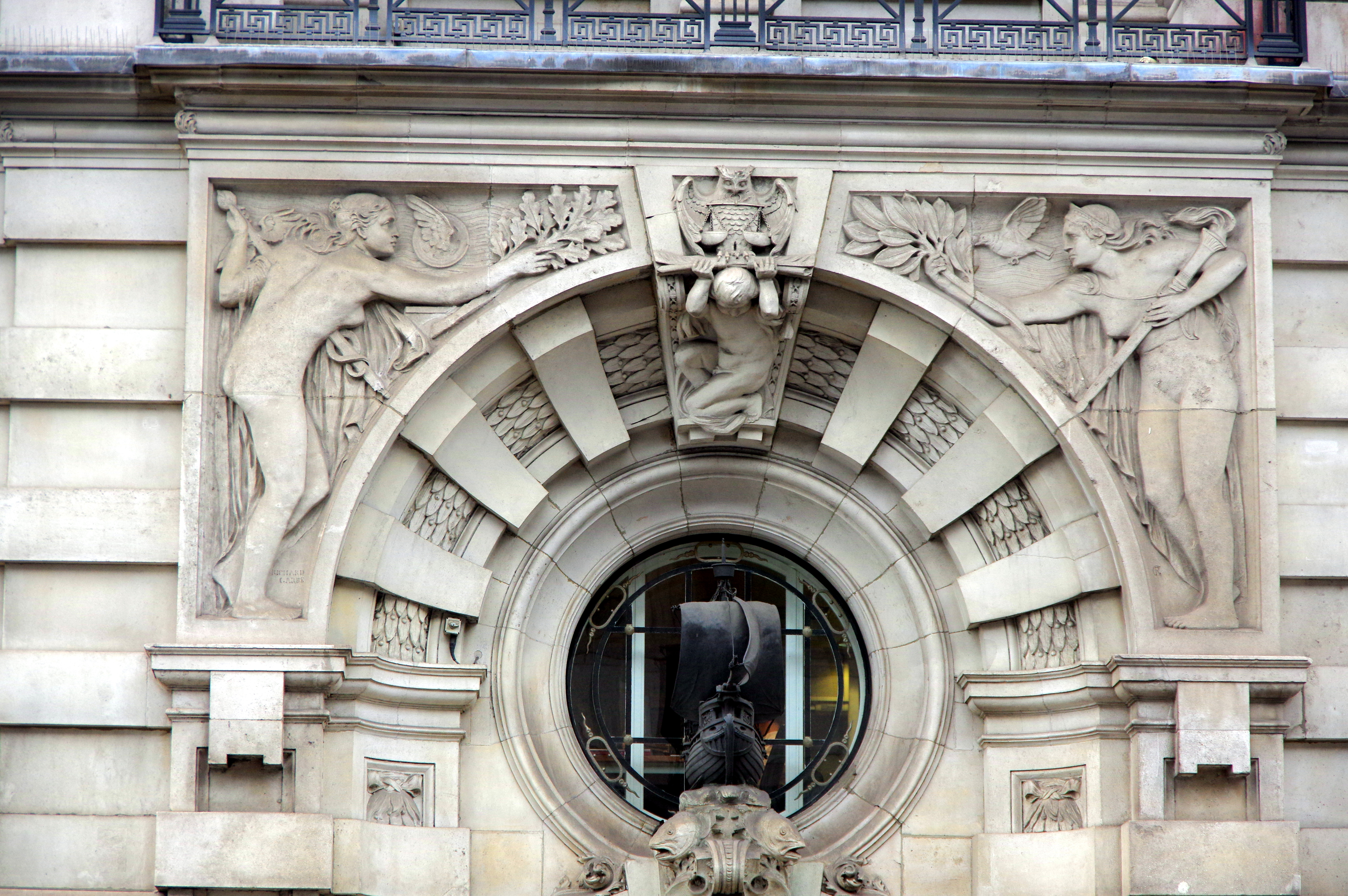
Wisdom in Commerce

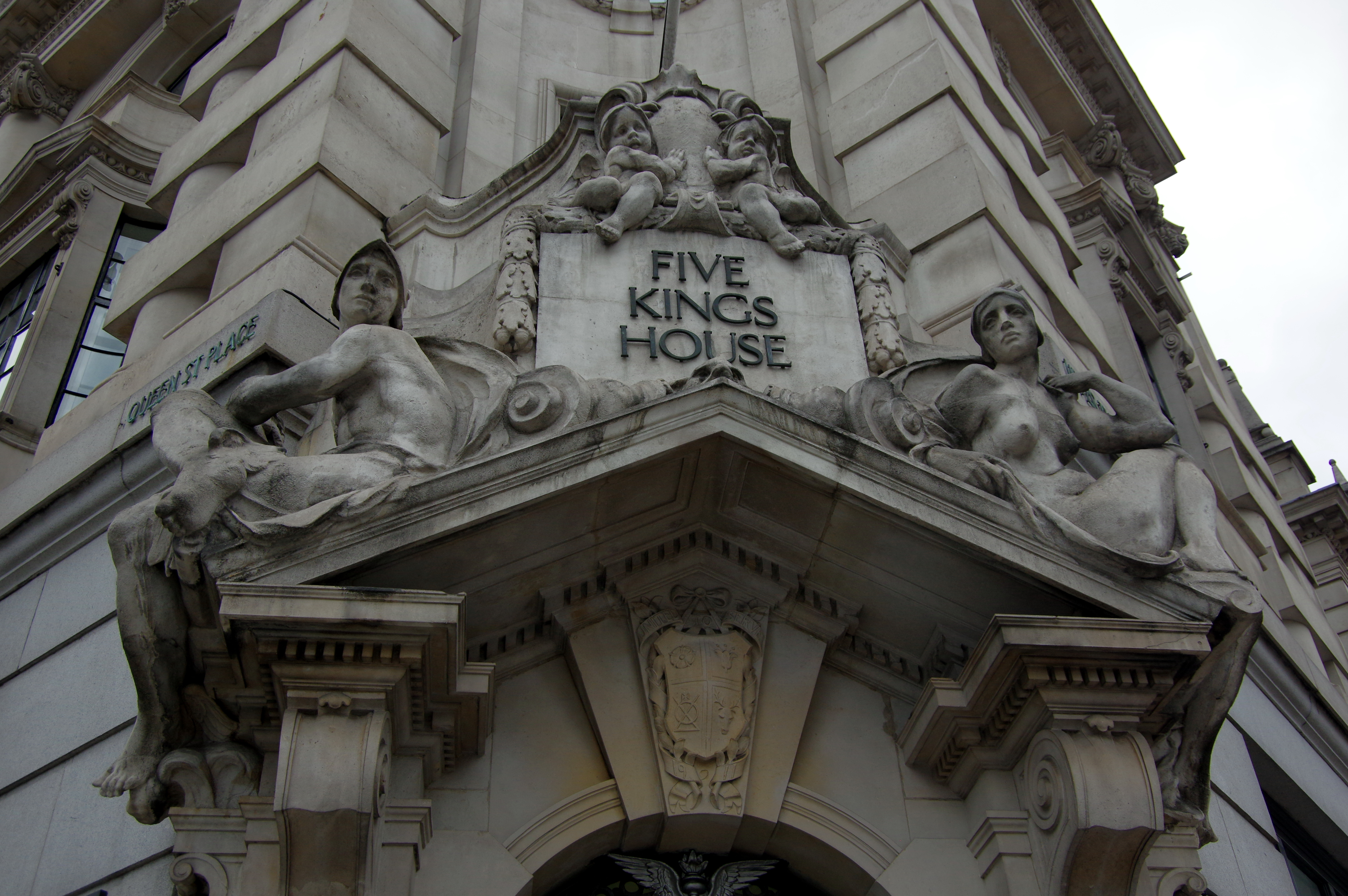
Mercury, Agriculture and putti
