= Arthur Keen (architect) =

- Born: 1861; Islington, London, England
- Died: 15 December 1938 (aged 76–77); England
- Known for: Architecture

Arthur Keen (1861 – 15 December 1938) was an English architect who was active largely in Victorian and Edwardian London, as well as in Surrey in the 1930s.

== Biography ==
Arthur Keen was educated at the City of London School, before apprenticing under Richard Norman Shaw in 1877. Keen would complete his studies at the Royal Academy Schools. He later worked as assistant to Ernest Newton before creating his own practice in 1889, initially sharing offices with Newton.

Keen was elected as a fellow of the Royal Institue of British Architects in 1904 and served on its council for 21 years, including as vice-president from 1925 to 1927. He was also president of the Architectural Association from 1910 to 1911.

== Works ==
Keen's works include:

- Headland Cottage (1900)
- Baptist Church House (1901)
- Interiors for Royal Society and Geological Society (c. 1905)
