= Camden Town Library =

Library in London, England

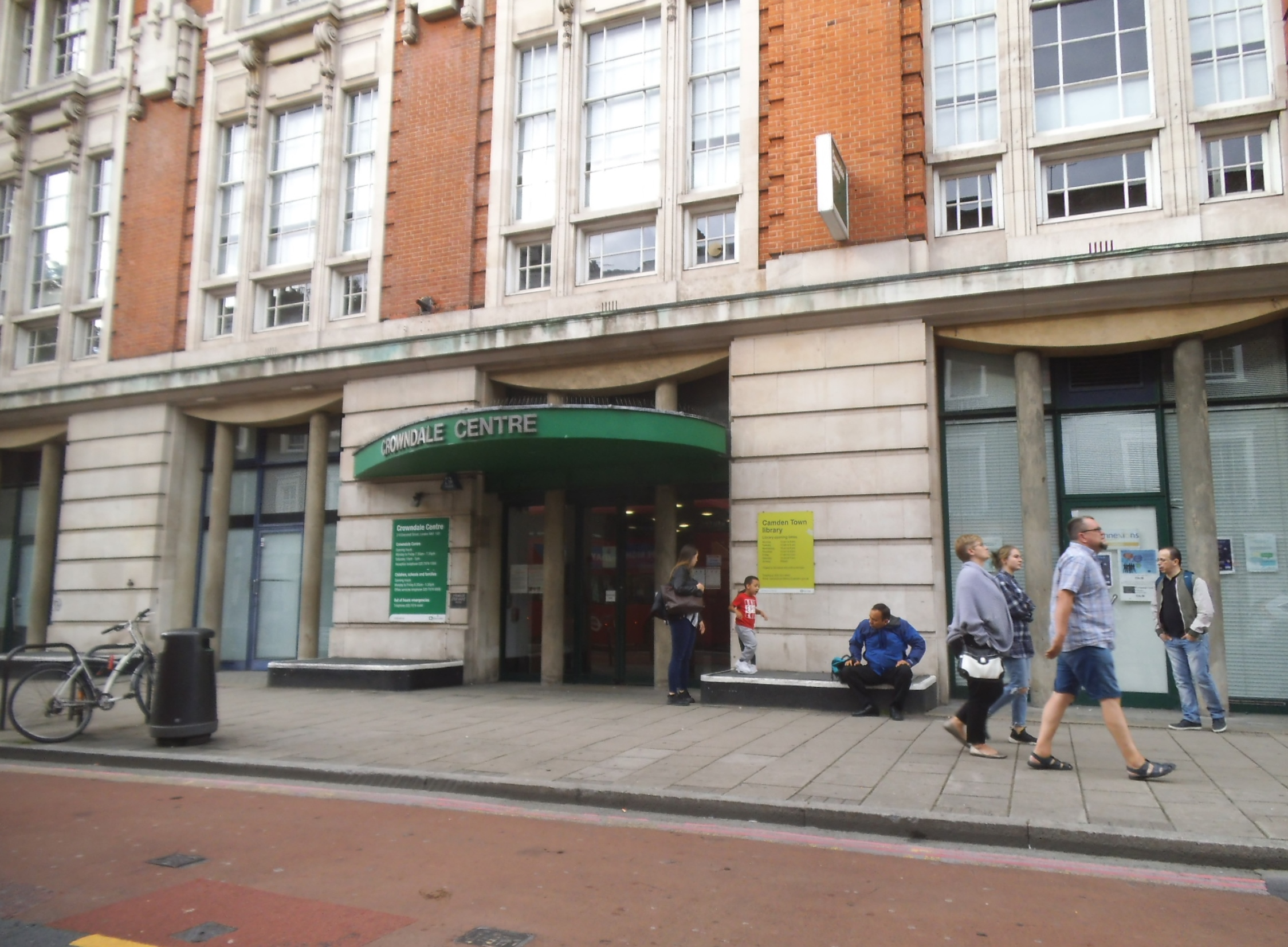
- 51.5340505°N 0.1378759579°W
- Location: England
- Type: public library
- Branch of: Public libraries of the London Borough of Camden

Collection
- Size: 14,934

Other information
- Website: camden.gov.uk/camden-town-library

Camden Town Library, also referred to as Camden Town Public Library, is a public library in the London Borough of Camden, England. It is located on the ground floor of Crowndale Centre in Camden Town.
