= Victoria House, London =

Office building in Bloomsbury, London, England

Coordinates: 51.5193°N 0.1221°W

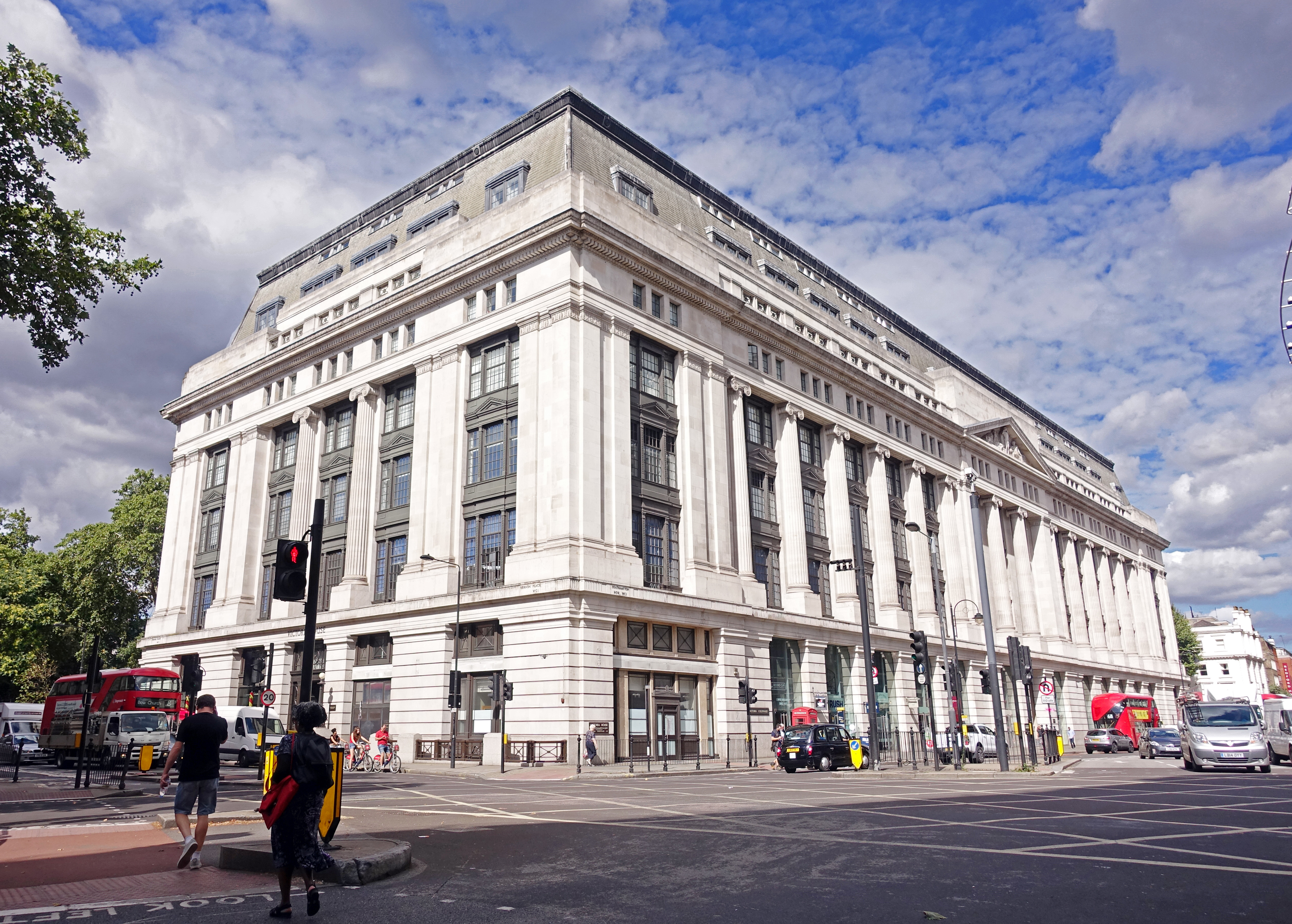
Viewed from Southampton Row

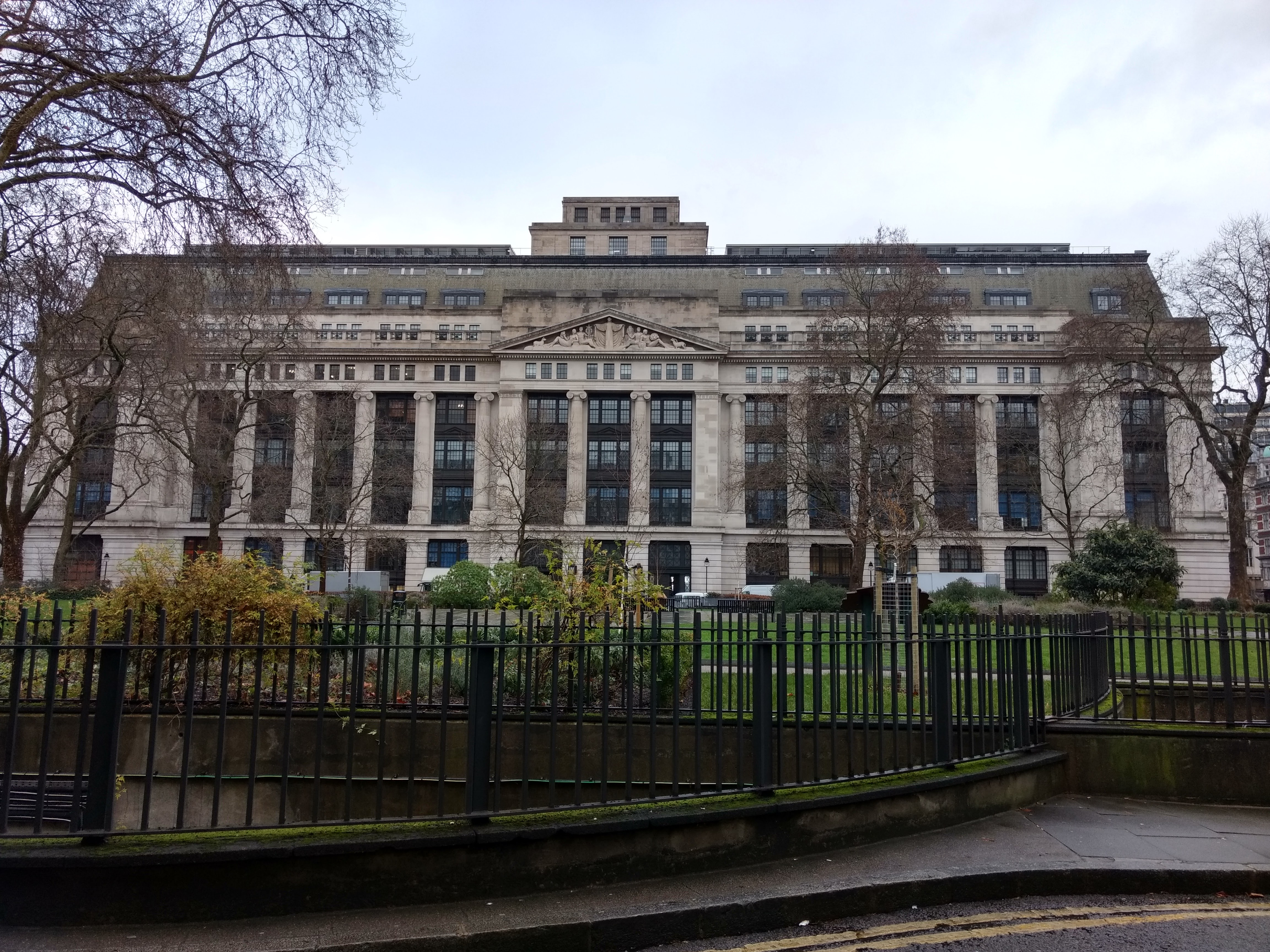
Viewed from Bloomsbury Square

Victoria House is a neoclassical building in Bloomsbury, London, WC1. It stands on a long rectangular island site between the east side of Bloomsbury Square and Southampton Row. It became a Grade II listed building in December 1990.

== History and description ==
The building was designed by Charles William Long and constructed in the 1920s, in a style described by Pevsner as "Neo-Grec". It was built for and occupied for many decades as the head office of the Liverpool Victoria Friendly Society. The east side of Bloomsbury Square was formerly a terrace of houses, which included the London house of the 18th century judge Lord Mansfield, which was looted in the Gordon Riots. The building was constructed between 1926 and 1932.

The building was constructed with a steel frame and Portland stone façades. It has eight main storeys, plus basement and sub-basement, with 15 bays along the east and west elevations, and five bays on the north and south sides. The rusticated ground floor level has retail units on Southampton Row. Giant order pilaster, separated by window openings, span the second to fourth floors, with porticos in the centre of each long side. The tympanum of each triangular pediment includes figurative sculptures by Herbert William Palliser, with the group to the west representing the bounty of the natural world and the group to the east representing navigation and industry. Two further storeys in the frieze and parapet levels, and two in the green slate mansard roof with dormer windows, topped by a small central two-storey feature above the mansard.

Inside, each side retains its original entrance lobby faced with Subiaco marble, and ornamental brasswork by the Bromsgrove Guild, some with the "VH" monogram. A large central space on the ground floor opens to three floors, with a coffered ceiling.

Although the exterior of the building is largely unchanged, the interior has been extensively modernised, with work completed in 2003. Interior features of historic interest were retained and refurbished to their former condition, including the original Art Deco ballroom which was transformed into the Bloomsbury Ballroom function venue, while other areas were substantially remodelled to create large amounts of office and leisure space. A retail area with open arcade was added to the Southampton Row frontage, recreating its former appearance prior to redevelopment in the 1950s. From Autumn 2024, Victoria House has featured 300,000 sq ft of office, laboratory and amenity space for multinational pharmaceutical companies.

The Bloomsbury Ballroom featured in the final episode of The Apprentice (UK series ten) where it was used as the location for the two finalists' business launches.

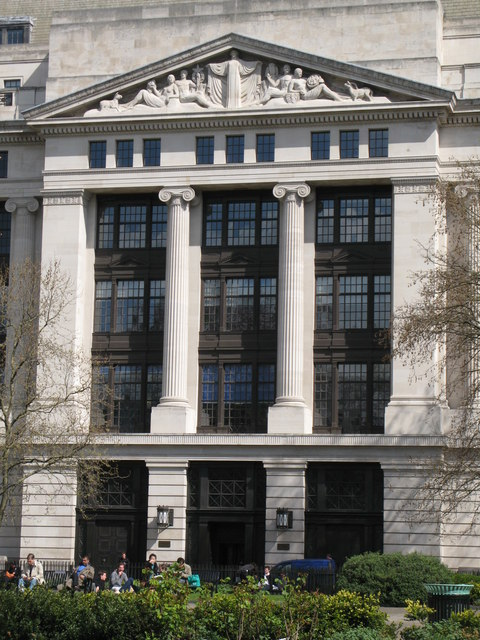
Portico on west side of building, facing Bloomsbury Square

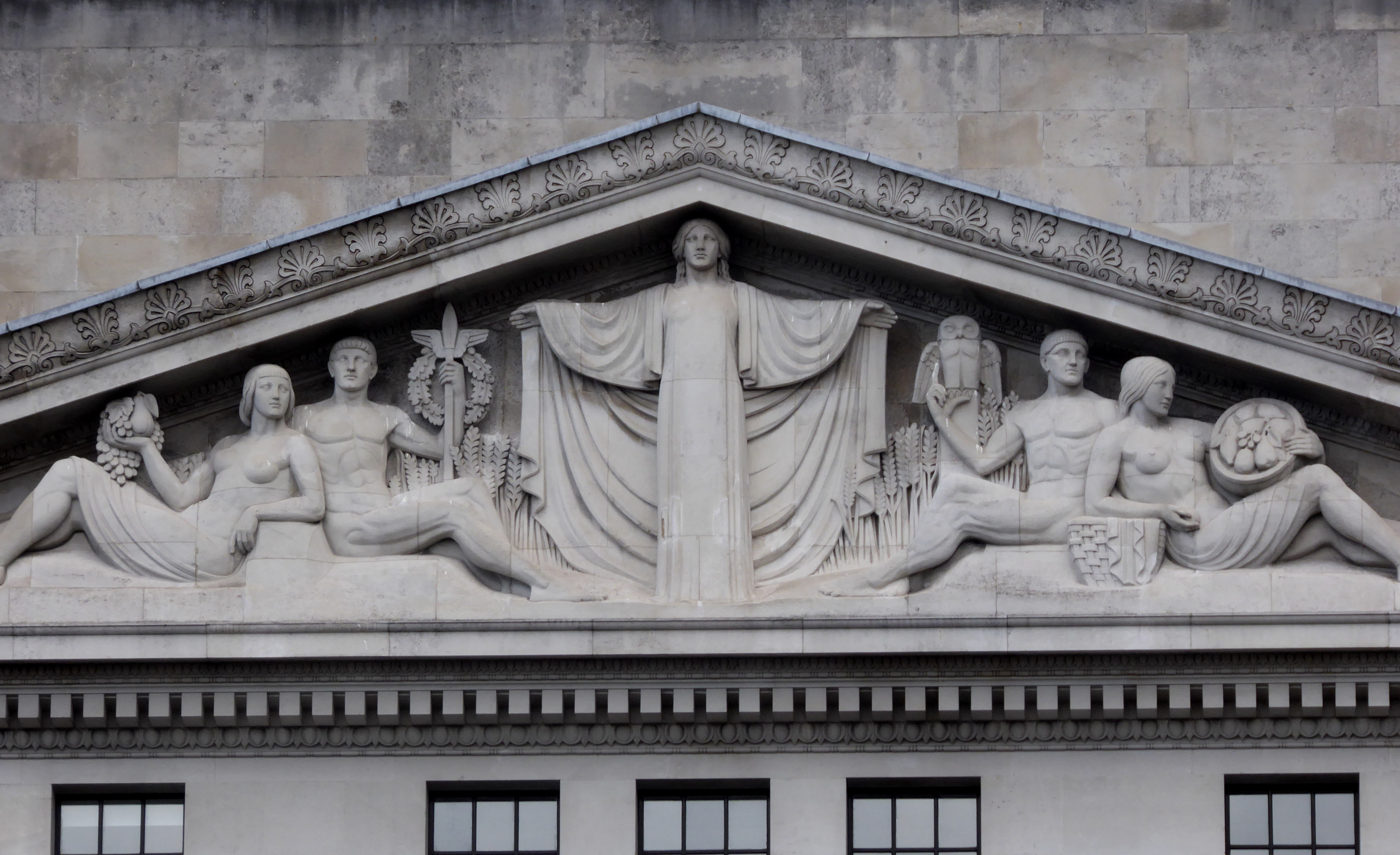
Detail of pediment at top of west portico, showing relief sculpture

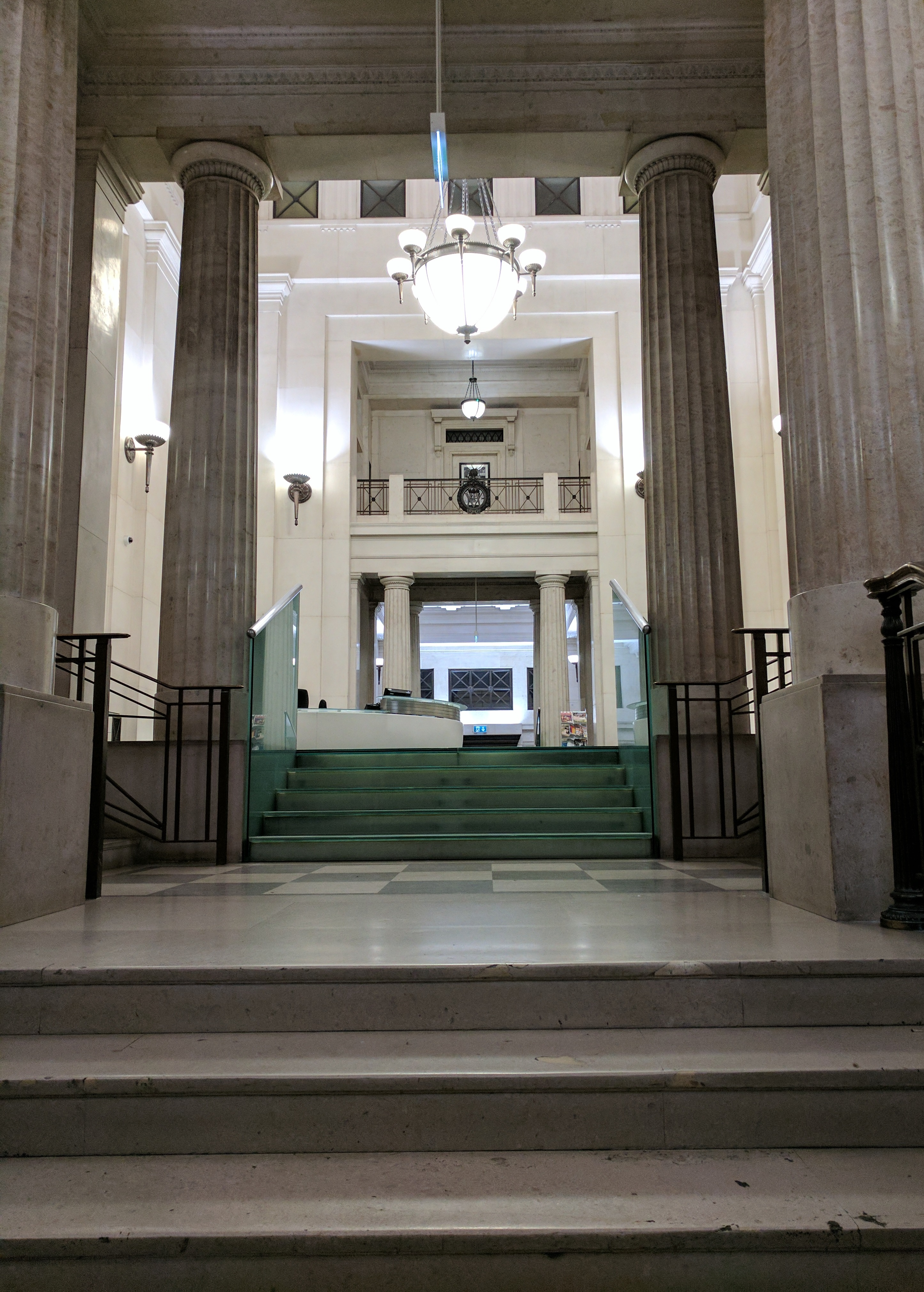
Inside main entrance

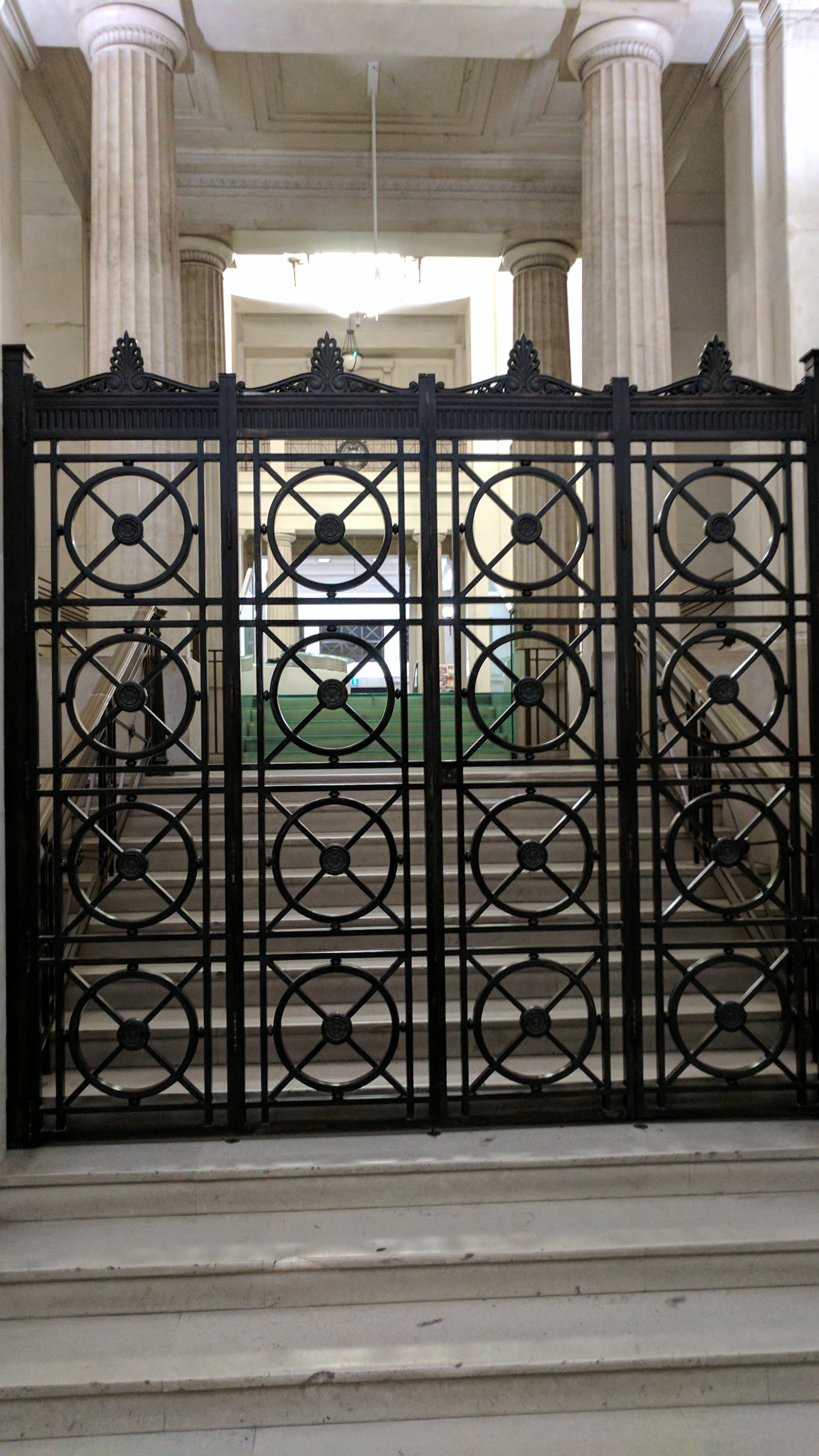
Detail of brasswork
