= Aviation House =

Building on Kingsway, London, England

Coordinates: 51.5170°N 0.1205°W

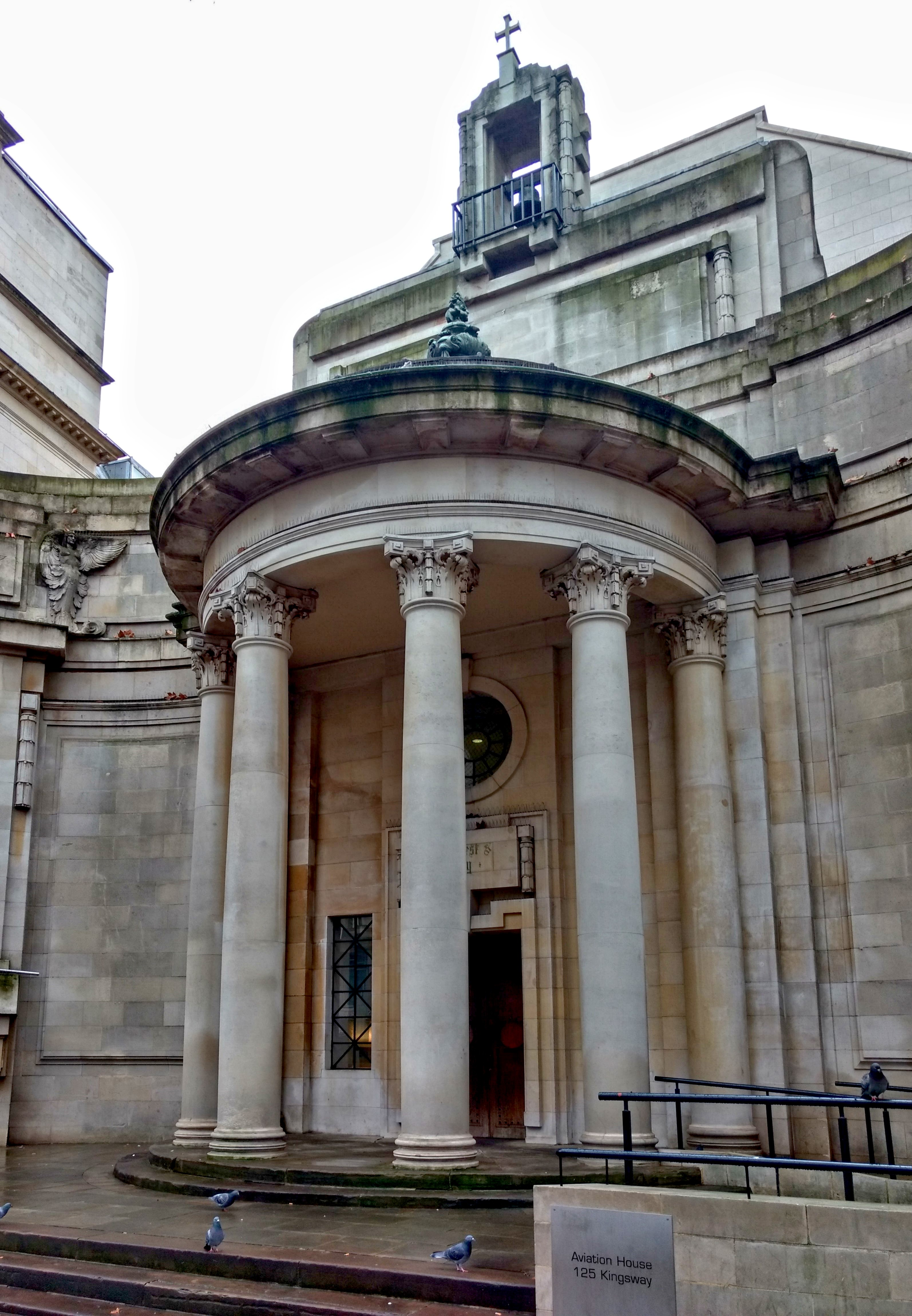
Aviation House

Aviation House, formerly the Church of the Holy Trinity, is a grade II listed building at 125-127 Kingsway (formerly Little Queen Street), in the London Borough of Camden.

== History ==
The Church of the Holy Trinity was built of Portland stone between 1909 and 1911 in an Edwardian Baroque style to a design by John Belcher and John James Joass. The facade was modelled on S. Maria della Pace in Rome by Pietro da Cortona. The interior was not completely finished due to a lack of money and a proposed tower was never built.

The church was originally a chapel of ease able to seat 1000. It replaced the original Little Queen Street Chapel (1829–31) whose foundations had been weakened during the construction of the Piccadilly line and which was demolished in 1909.

The building was listed grade II by English Heritage in 1974.

The church was closed by 1991. The rear was redeveloped into offices around 1999 with the listed front retained. It was renamed Aviation House. Previous tenants have included Government Digital Service. The offices are now home to a WeWork coworking space.
