= A4200 road =

Major thoroughfare in central London

A4200

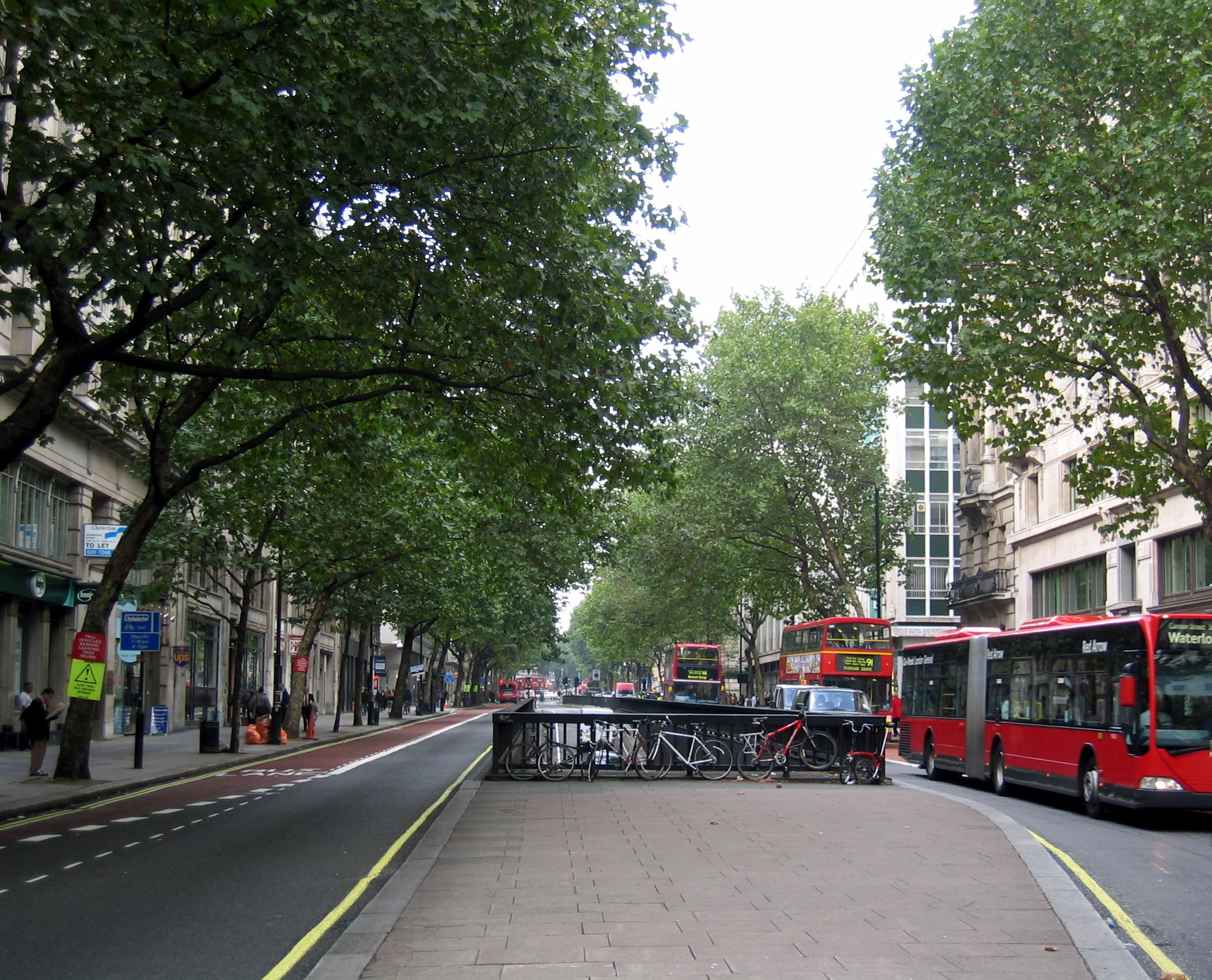
- A4200 Kingsway from the south in 2009

Route information
- Length: 2.0 mi (3.2 km)

Major junctions
- South end: A4 Aldwych
- A4; A301; A40; A501; A400
- East end: A400 Camden High Street, next to Mornington Crescent tube station

Location
- Country: United Kingdom
- Constituent country: England
- Administrative areas: Greater London
- Primary destinations: Aldwych; Holborn; Bloomsbury; Euston; Somerstown; Camden Town

Road network
- Roads in the United Kingdom; Motorways; A and B road zones
← A4198	→ A4201

The A4200 is a major thoroughfare in central London. It runs between the A4 at Aldwych, to the A400 Hampstead Road/Camden High Street, at Mornington Crescent tube station, via Holborn, Bloomsbury, Euston and Somers Town.

== Kingsway ==
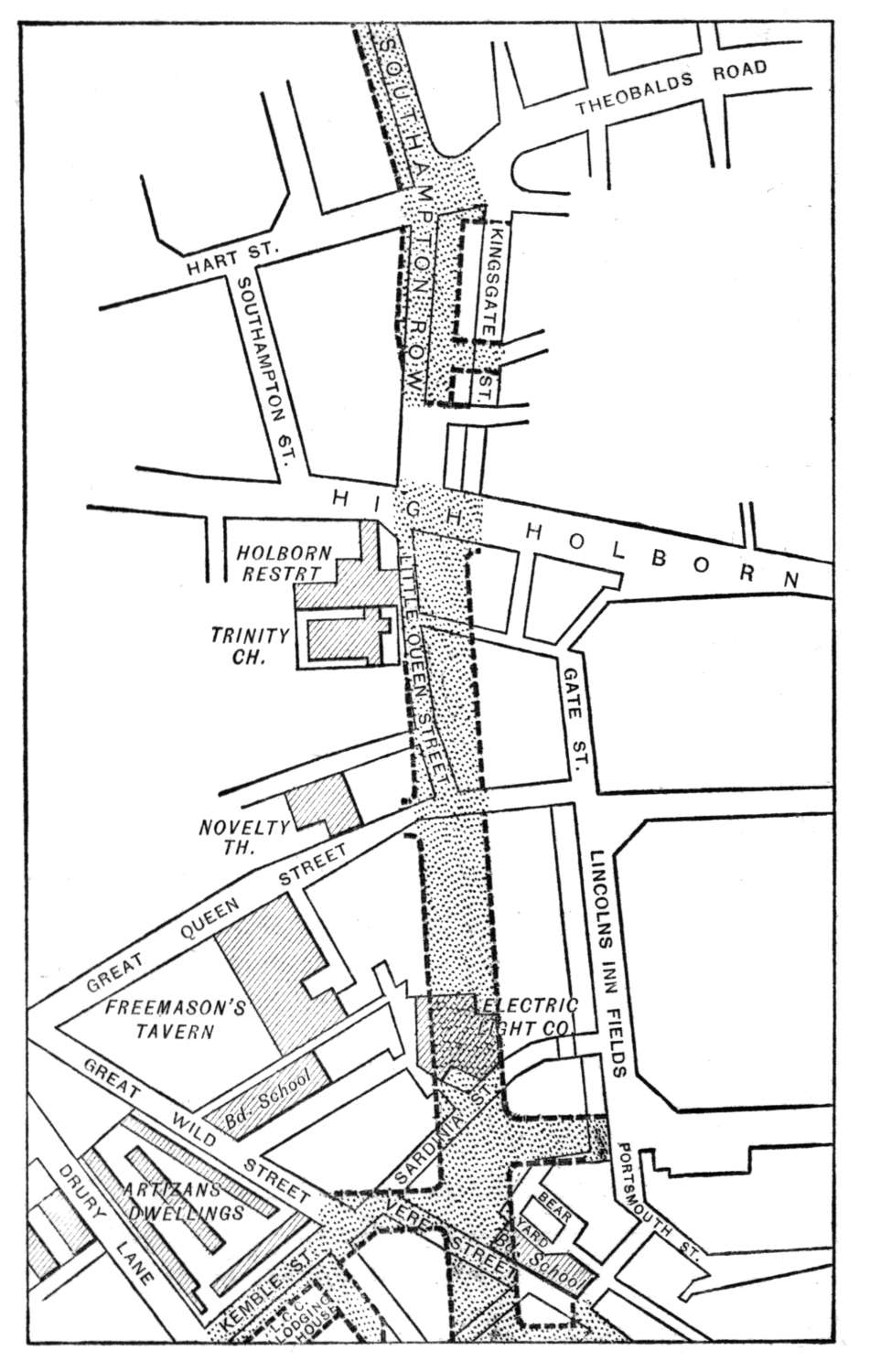
Map showing proposed route, c. 1900

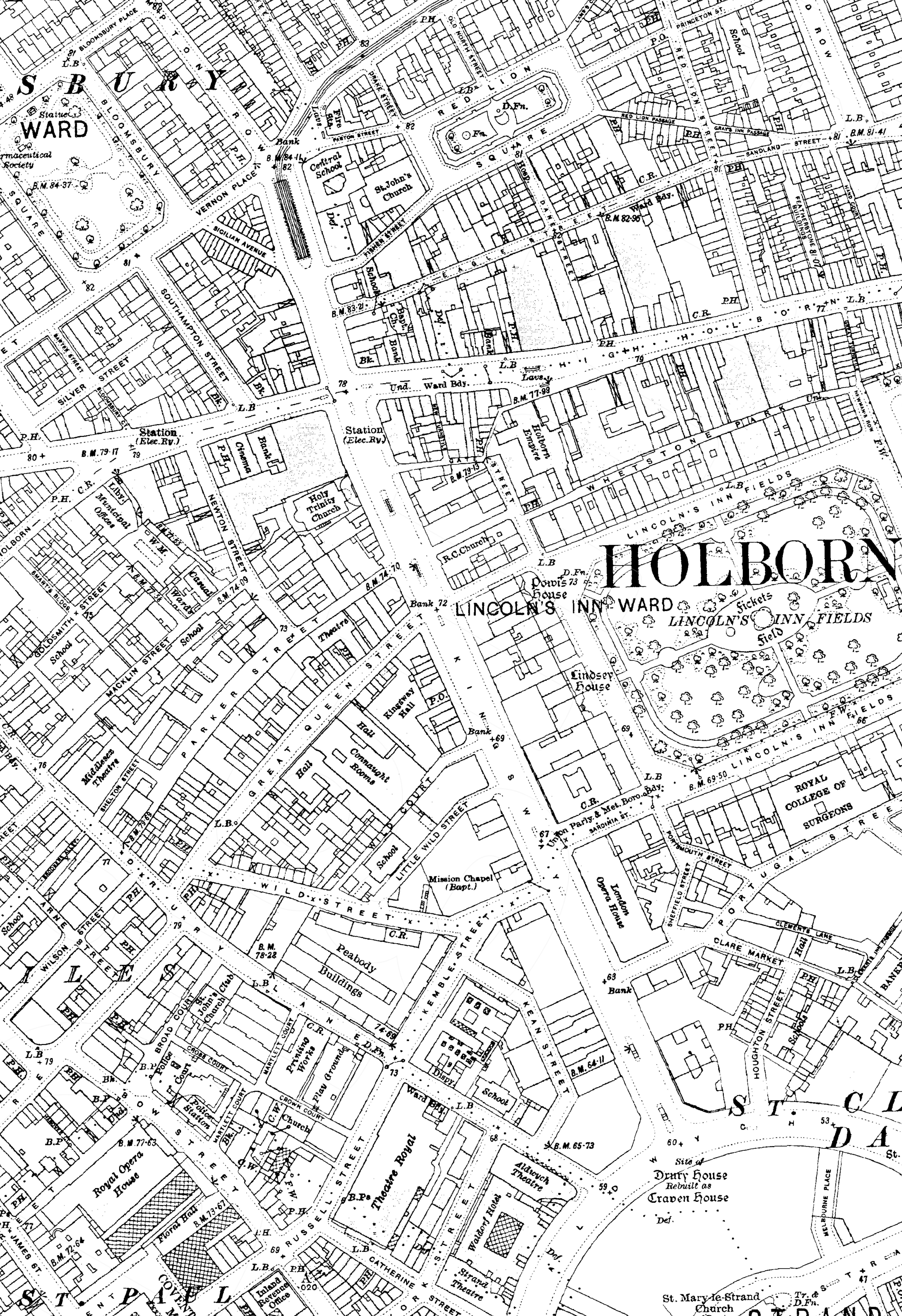
A 1910s Ordnance Survey map showing Kingsway just after it had been built and showing the entrance to the tramway tunnel at the north end

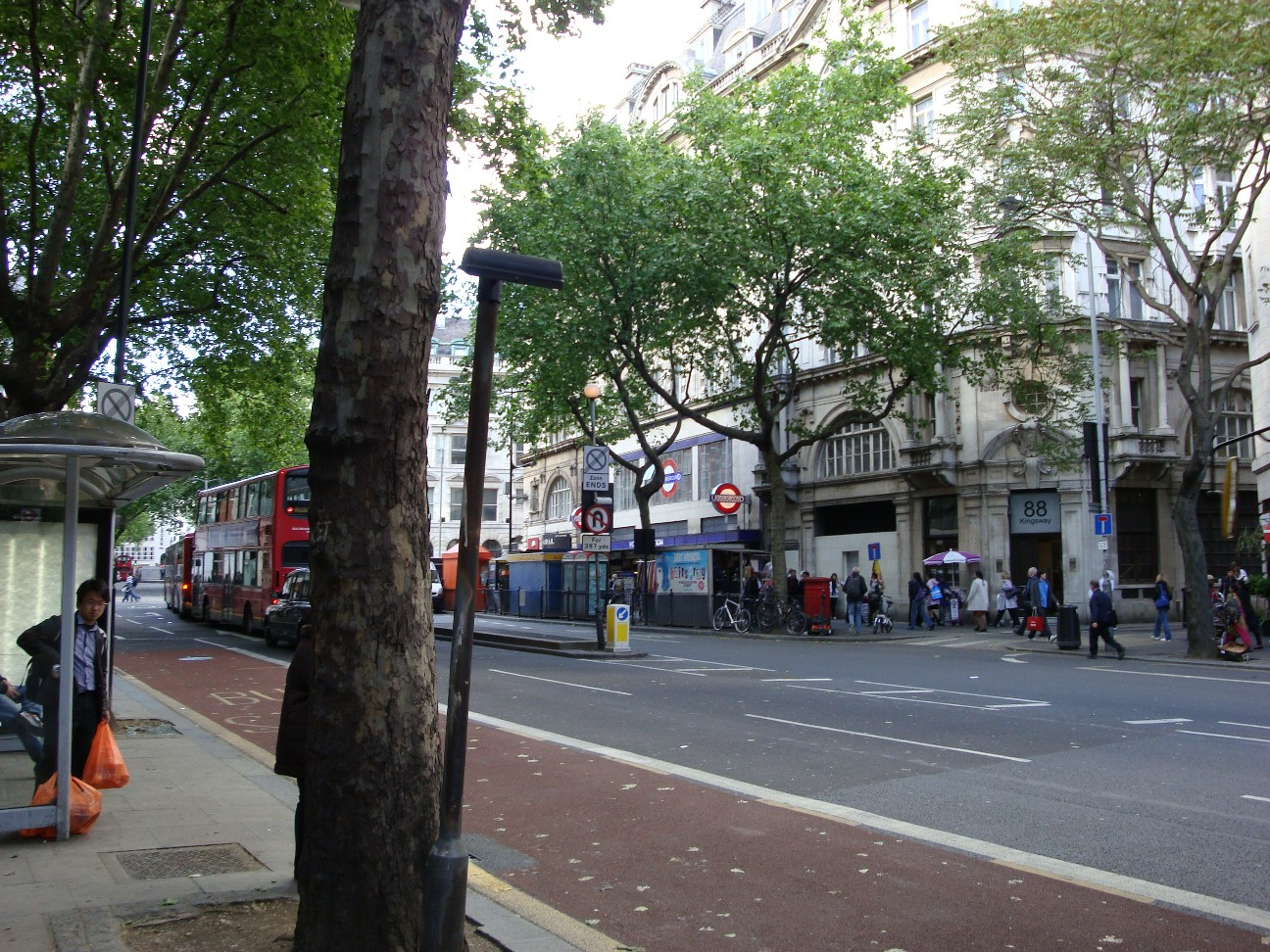
Kingsway

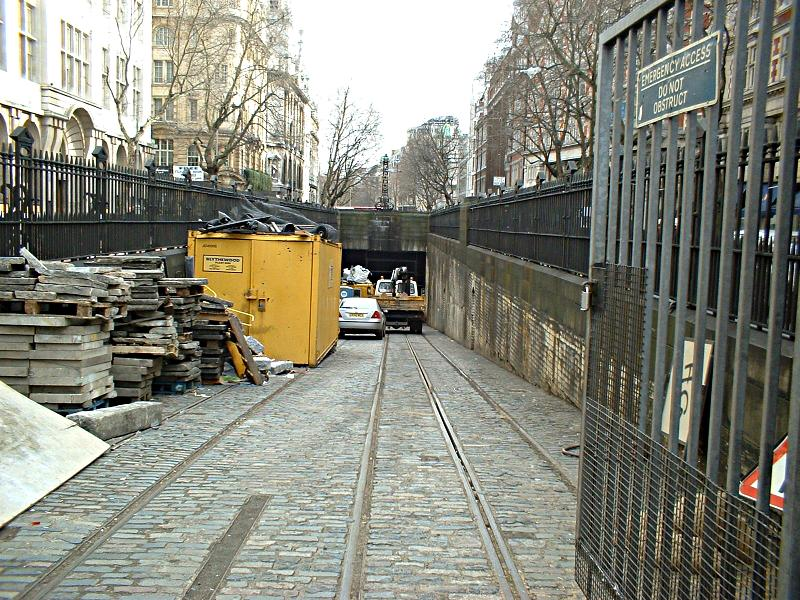
Kingsway tram tunnel entrance in Southampton Row

Kingsway is a major road in central London, designated as part of the A4200. It runs from High Holborn, at its north end in the London Borough of Camden, and meets Aldwych in the south in the City of Westminster at Bush House. It was opened by King Edward VII in 1905. Together Kingsway and Aldwych form one of the major north–south routes through central London linking the ancient east–west routes of High Holborn and Strand. The name "King's Way" originally applied to what is now Theobalds Road, as it was the route that King James I took when travelling from London to his residence Theobalds Palace in Hertfordshire.

=== History ===
==== Building the road ====
The road was purpose-built as part of a major redevelopment of the area in the 1900s. Its route cleared away the maze of small streets in Holborn such as Little Queen Street and the surrounding slum dwellings. However, Holy Trinity Church in Little Queen Street was spared, whereas the Sardinian Embassy Chapel, an important Roman Catholic church attached to the Embassy of the Kingdom of Sardinia, was demolished to make way for the new street.

Plans were published by London County Council in 1898, authorised by the London County Council (Improvements) Act 1899 (62 & 63 Vict. c. cclxvi) and the road was formally opened in 1905. It is one of the broadest streets in central London at 100 feet (30 m) wide. There were several proposed names for the new street, including King Edward VII Street, Empire Avenue, Imperial Avenue and Connecticut Avenue. The name "Kingsway" was in honour of King Edward VII, who opened the street.

==== Tramway tunnel ====
It was unique in containing below it a tunnel for a tramway, which started just north of Southampton Row, passed beneath Aldwych and continued to the Thames Embankment; this Kingsway tramway subway joined the North and South London tram systems. In 1958 the disused tunnel was reopened at the southern end to make a new connection, the Strand Underpass, for light traffic between Waterloo Bridge and Kingsway in order to reduce congestion. Also beneath Kingsway was a branch of the Piccadilly tube line from Holborn to Aldwych station on the Strand; this was closed in 1994. Aldwych station is still used for television and film sets that require underground scenes. During the Second World War the branch was used to store art treasures from the British Museum, including the Elgin Marbles.

==== 2015 underground electrical cable fire ====
On 1 April 2015, electrical cables under the pavement in Kingsway caught fire, leading to serious disruption in central London. The fire continued for the next two days, with flames shooting out of a manhole cover from a burst gas main, before being extinguished. Several thousand people were evacuated from nearby offices, and several theatres cancelled performances. There was also substantial disruption to telecoms infrastructure. On 8 April, press reports emerged stating that the fire may have been started as part of the 2015 Hatton Garden burglary; however, the investigation into how the fire started stated on 9 April that it came from an electrical fault.

=== Buildings ===
The original buildings were built between 1903 and 1905. They were mostly mid-rises in stone, and in various styles including neoclassical and neo-Baroque. Many survive but some have been replaced. Notable buildings include:

- 61 Aldwych, previously Television House, the headquarters of Associated-Rediffusion Television
- Africa House
- Alexandra House
- Aviation House, formerly the Church of the Holy Trinity, in an Edwardian Baroque style.
- Bush House, King's College London
- Civil Aviation Authority House (formerly known as Space House)
- Kingsway Hall, Methodist mission hall opened in 1912; from 1926, the church allowed HMV (EMI from 1931), to use it as a recording studio. In 1944 EMI was joined by Decca Records.
- Victory House (the London Central Employment Tribunal)
- York House
- Various buildings of the London School of Economics

=== Transport ===
==== Closest London Underground stations ====
The closest tube stations are Holborn, which is at the top of the road, at the junction with High Holborn, as well as Temple, and formerly Aldwych, which closed in 1994.

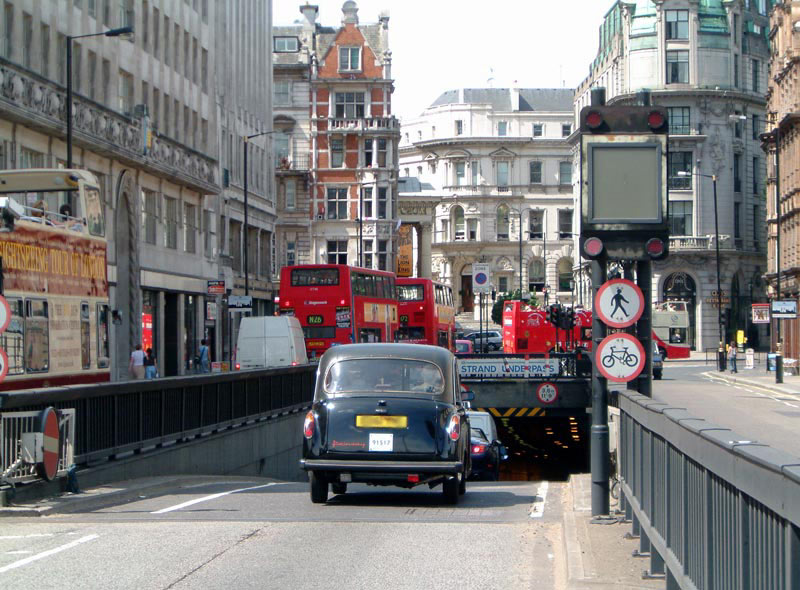
Part of the subway is now a tunnel for cars.

==== Strand Underpass ====
As part of the redevelopment a tram tunnel was built underneath the road. The trams ceased to run in the 1950s and, since 1961, the southern end of the tunnel has been used by cars under the name of the Strand Underpass. The northern entrance to the tunnel still exists (with its tram lines still in situ, see image right) and can be found at the junction of Southampton Row and Vernon Place.

=== Culture ===
==== 1909 Edward Elgar song ====
On 27 December 1909, a song by the English composer Edward Elgar, named The King's Way, celebrates the opening of Kingsway. The words are written by his wife, Caroline Alice Elgar. The song was first performed at an Alexandra Palace concert on 15 January 1910, sung by Clara Butt.

== Southampton Row ==
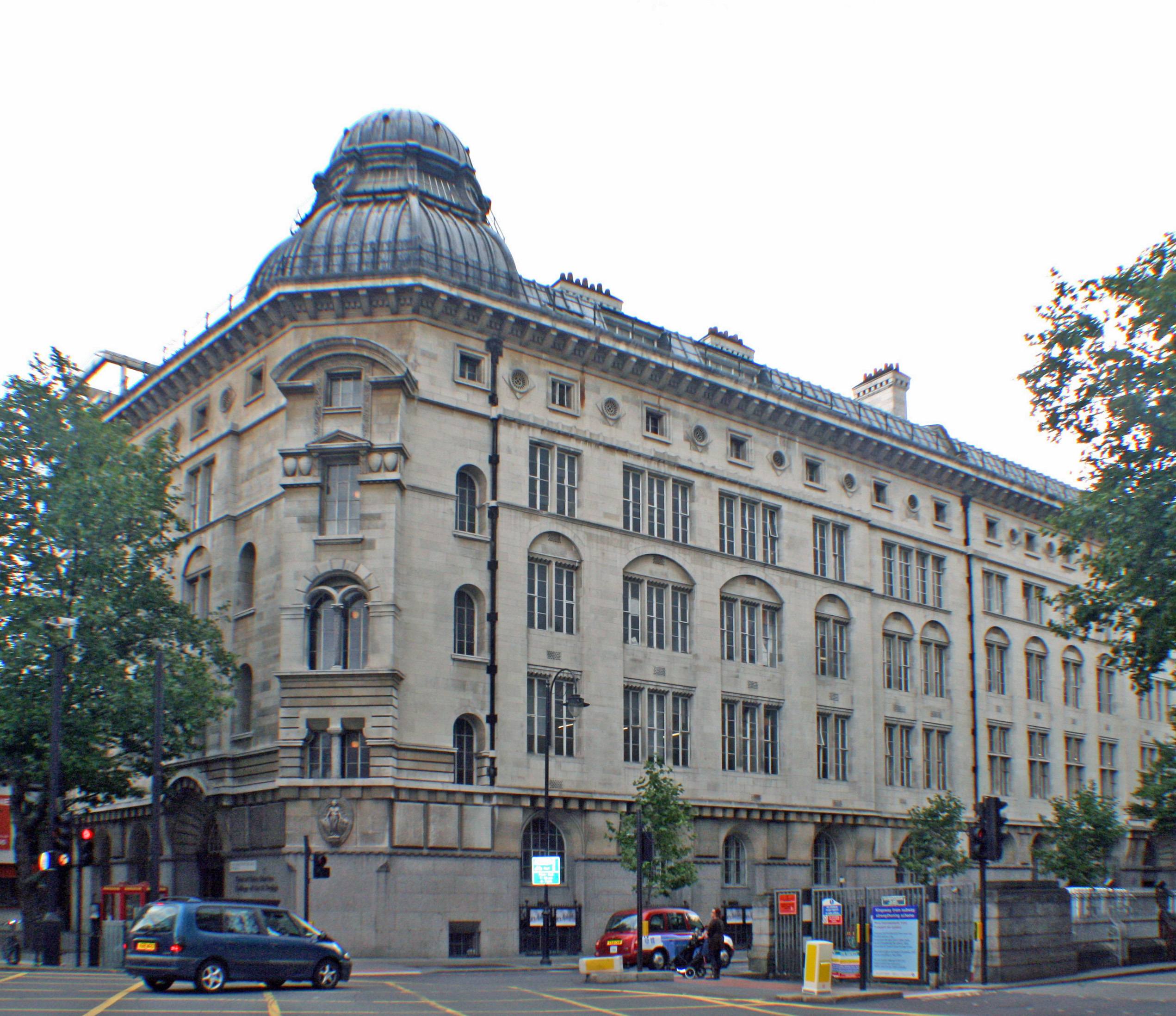
Central Saint Martins College of Art and Design, Southampton Row campus at the junction with Theobald's Road.

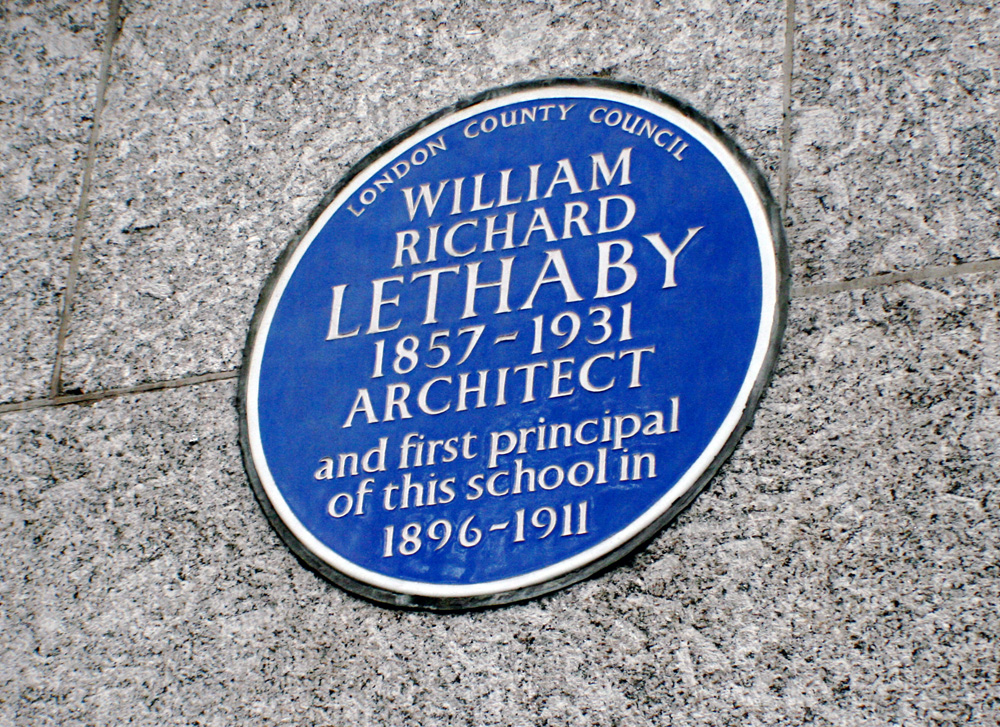
Blue plaque for the architect William Lethaby (1857–1931), a key figure in the foundation of the original Central School.

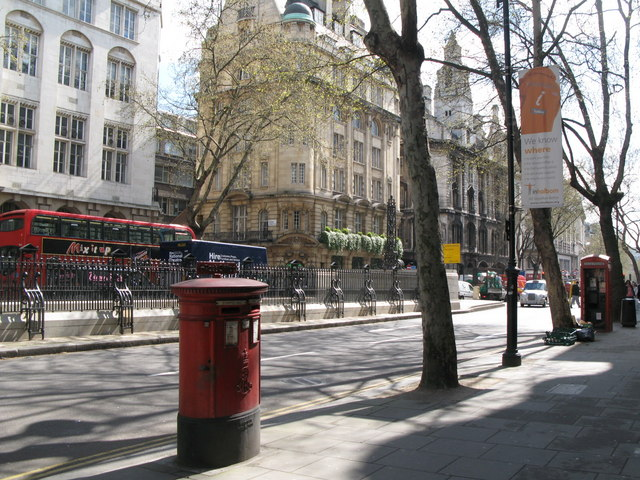
Southern end of Southampton Row looking south from the junction with Theobald's Road.

Southampton Row is a major thoroughfare running northwest–southeast in Bloomsbury, Camden, central London, England.

=== Name ===
The street was named after Thomas Wriothesley, 4th Earl of Southampton. It was previously known as King Street

=== History ===
==== 1822 – Henry Hetherington printing press ====
In 1822, the Chartist Henry Hetherington registered a printing press at 13 Kingsgate Street (a smaller street parallel to King street, but demolished during the 1903-05 Kingsway development). This was an eight-roomed house, including shop and printing premises—at an annual rent of £55. His first published book was in January 1823, and was named Mudie's journal, the Political Economist and Universal Philanthropist.

==== Pre–1837 – home of Robert William Sievier ====
The first studio of the sculptor Robert William Sievier (1794–1865) was in Southampton Row until 1837, where he relocated to Henrietta Street, near Cavendish Square, and he also had a separate residence in Upper Holloway.

==== 1896 – beginning of the Central School of Art & Design ====
The Central School of Art and Design, formerly the Central School of Arts and Crafts, was established by the London County Council in 1896 in Southampton Row to provide specialist art teaching for workers in the craft industries. The architect William Lethaby (1857–1931) was the first Principal, as recorded by a blue plaque on Southampton Row.

==== 1899 – Sir John Barbirolli was born ====
Sir John Barbirolli, the conductor and cellist, was born in Southampton Row on 2 December 1899. A commemorative blue plaque was placed on the wall of the Bloomsbury Park Hotel in May 1993 to mark his birthplace.

==== 1907 – Institute of Education moving buildings ====
In 1907, the Institute of Education moved to its first purpose-built building on Southampton Row. In 1938, the Institute moved to the Senate House complex of the University of London on Malet Street, not far away to the northwest.

==== 1933 – Leó Szilárd insight ====
On 12 September 1933, the Hungarian physicist Leó Szilárd, an exile from Nazi Germany, was crossing Southampton Row at the junction with Russell Square when he conceived the idea of a nuclear chain reaction, which led directly to the development of nuclear weapons and nuclear power.

==== 1953 – beginning of the Sue Ryder Care charity ====
The Sue Ryder Care charity, established in 1953, is registered at 114–118 Southampton Row.

==== 1953 - bookshop opening ====
Also in 1953, John Cass opened a bookshop on Southampton Row, where he began publishing books and journals which were acquired by Taylor & Francis in 2003.

==== 1966 – Indica Bookshop and Indica Gallery separation ====
In 1966, the Indica Bookshop was separated from the Indica Gallery, a counterculture art gallery supported by Paul McCartney, and moved to 102 Southampton Row in the summer of that year.

==== Today ====
As of 2022 a major route for buses, the street once formed part of a tram route that included a tunnel for trams.

== Woburn Place and Upper Woburn Place ==
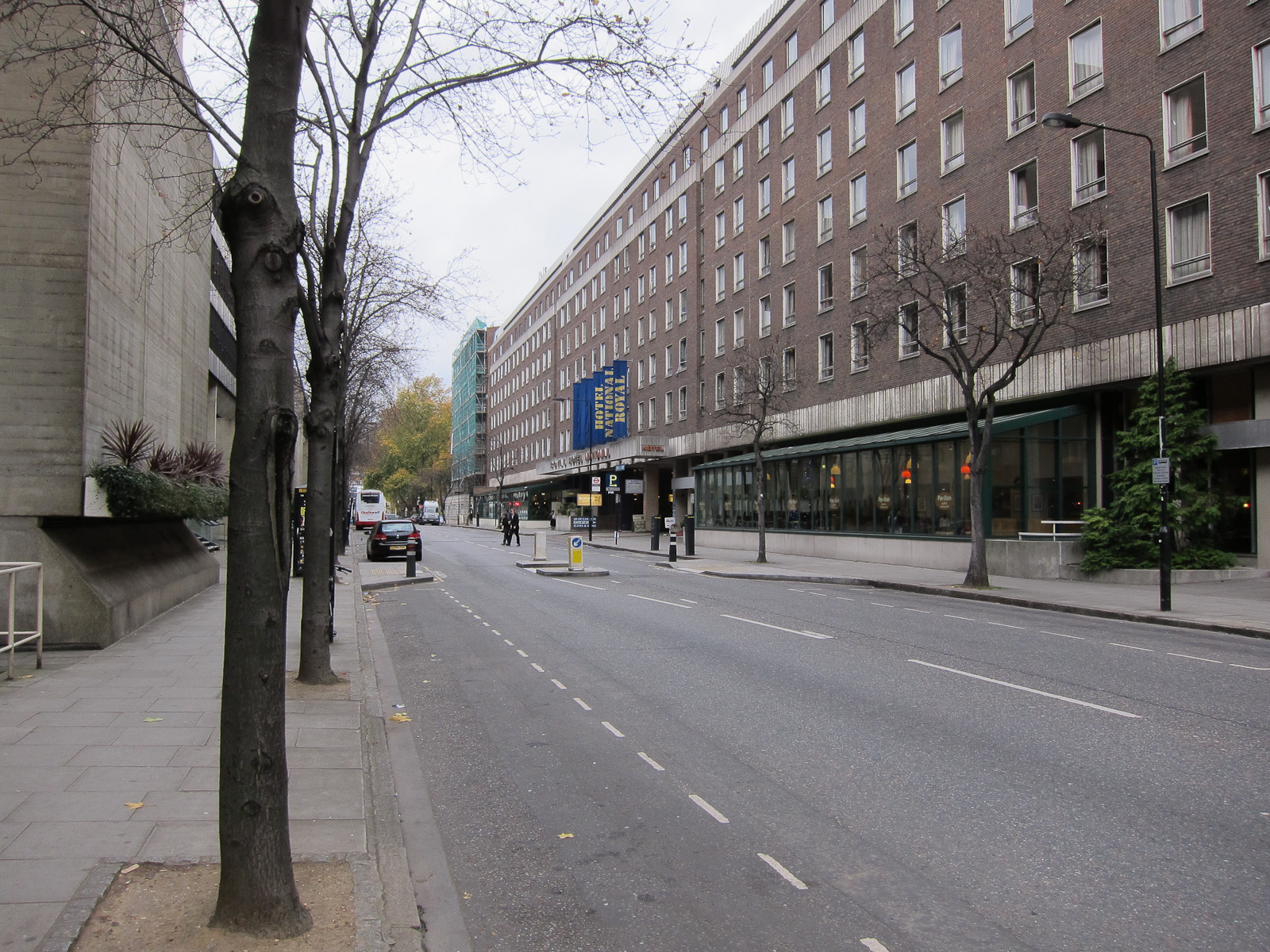
Woburn Place, facing the Royal National Hotel

Woburn Place is a street in central London, England, named after Woburn Abbey, home to the Dukes of Bedford who developed much of Bloomsbury. It is located in the Bloomsbury area of Camden.

=== Surroundings ===
To the north is Tavistock Square and to the south-east is Russell Square. Past Tavistock Square the road becomes Upper Woburn Place until the junction with Euston Road. The Royal National Hotel building is located in the south-west side of Woburn Place north of Russell Square, with 1,630 rooms on eight floors, is the largest hotel in the UK. The British Medical Association building is at the junction of Upper Woburn Place with Tavistock Square.

=== Property values ===
Property values are high in this area. For example, in 2005 a freehold office building at 19–29 Woburn Place (9,400 m^{2}, 101,000 sq ft) was sold for £22.6 million.

=== 7 July 2005 bombing ===
On 7 July 2005, a suicide bomb planted by 18-year-old Hasib Hussain detonated aboard a double decker bus passing Tavistock Square as it was travelling from Marble Arch to Oxford Circus on route 30, killing 13 passengers, plus Hussain himself. The bus had been diverted to Woburn Place due to road closures resulting from the earlier bombings.

== Eversholt Street ==
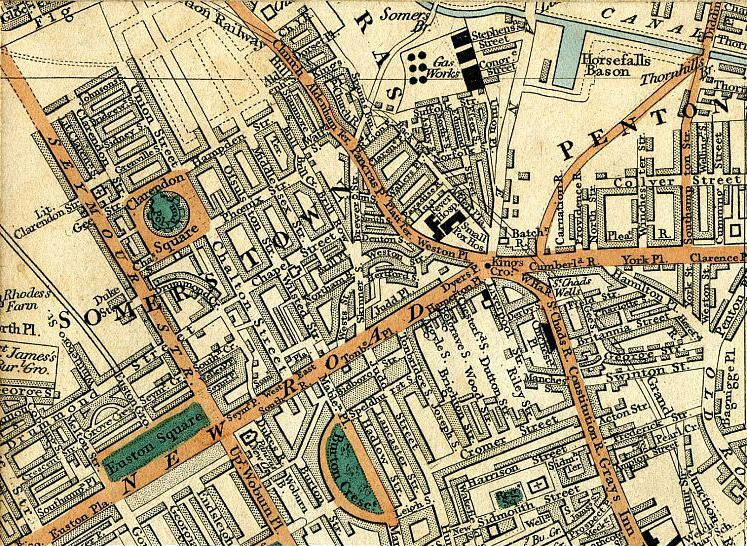
Map of Somers Town in 1837 before the building of Euston station and which shows the street as "Seymour Street".

Eversholt Street is a street in the London Borough of Camden in London, England. It lies in Somers Town, London: stretching a kilometre from Euston railway station in the south to Camden Town in the north.

=== Route ===
Eversholt Street starts at Euston Road, between Euston Square Gardens and Euston Fire Station. It travels north, including Euston House, the grade-II listed Royal George, the grade-II listed 64 Eversholt Street, the grade-II listed Church of St Mary the Virgin, the grade-II listed Eversholt House, and Camden Council's The Crowndale Centre which includes Camden Town Library. It joins Camden High Street at Mornington Crescent station. It also includes a controversial strip bar that is the subject of many articles in local newspapers.

=== History ===
The road was laid out in the 1810s as part of the Bedford Estate. It was called "Seymour Street", as shown in the map to the right, until 1938 when it was renamed. It took its new name from Eversholt which is a village in Bedfordshire (which comes from Anglo-Saxon meaning "wood of the wild boar") near Ampthill, which gave its name to Ampthill Square nearby, and follows a theme of names related to the Duke of Bedford. It in turn gives its name to Eversholt Rail Group.

== See also ==
- Kingsway telephone exchange, an underground telephone exchange in Chancery Lane.
- List of eponymous roads in London
- Southampton Street, Westminster, London
- Sicilian Avenue, Bloomsbury, London
- Woburn Square
- Woburn Walk
