= 7 July 2005 London bombings memorials and services =

Memorials for the July 2005 London bombings

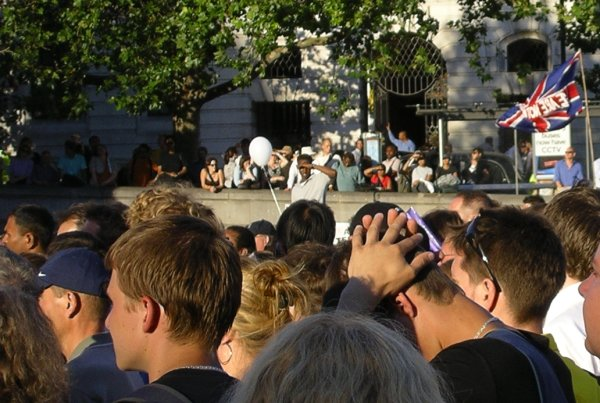
Londoners in Trafalgar Square on the evening of 14 July 2005

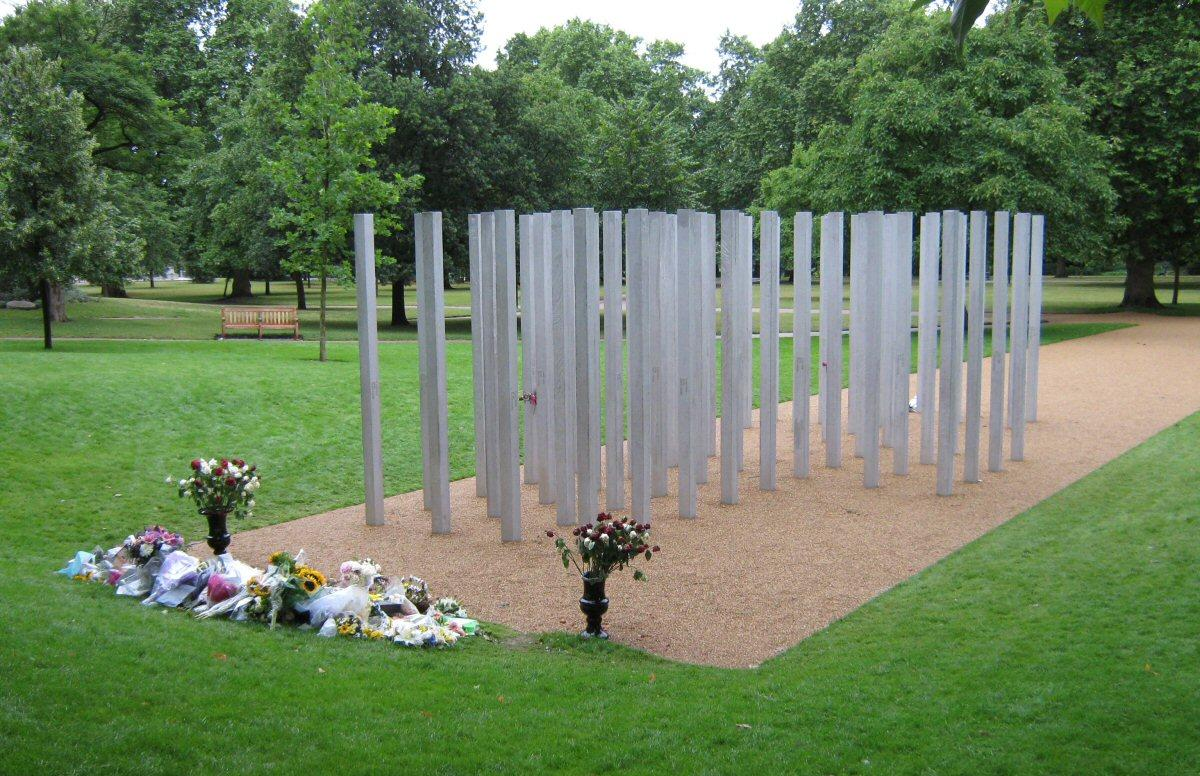
The 7 July Memorial in Hyde Park

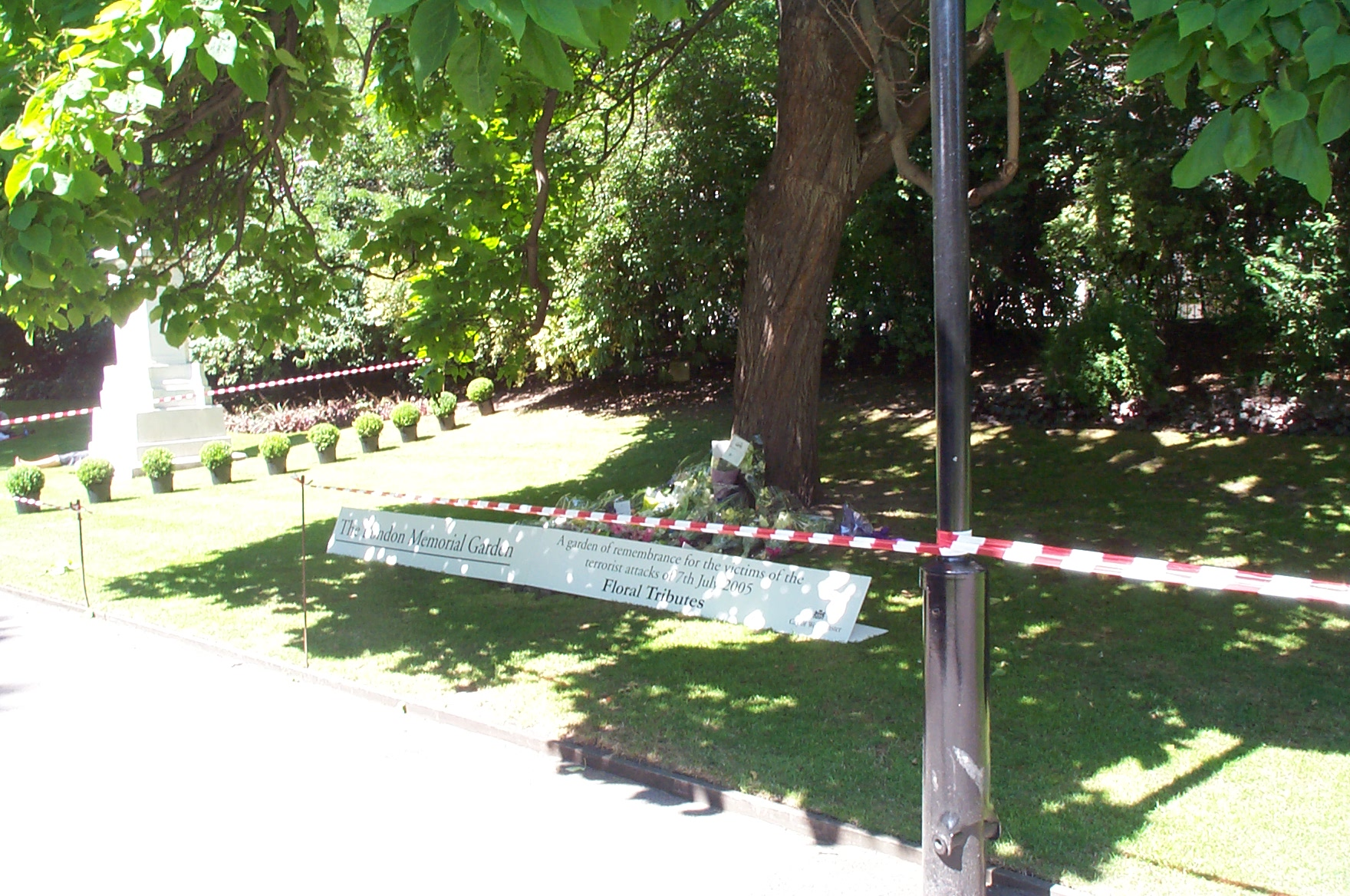
The London Memorial Garden set up by the City of Westminster in the Victoria Embankment Park, in remembrance of the victims of the terrorist attacks of 7 July 2005.

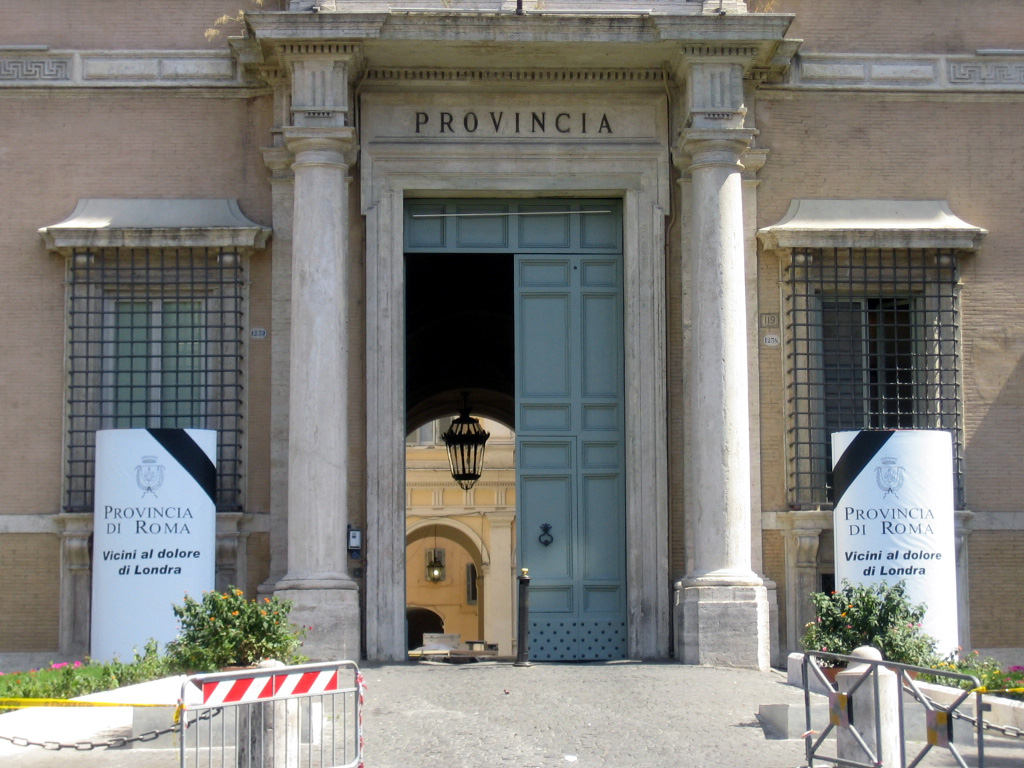
The Palazzo Valentini (the provincial seat of government in Rome) mourning the London Bombings. The posters read: "The Province of Rome. Close to the suffering of London".

Following the events of the 7 July 2005 London bombings, the United Kingdom and other nations have devised many ways to honour the dead and missing. Most of these memorials included moments of silence, candle-lit vigils, and laying of flowers at the bombing sites. Foreign leaders have also honoured the dead by ordering their flags to be half-masted, signed books of condolences at embassies of the United Kingdom, and issued messages of support and condolences to the British people.

== United Kingdom ==
- The government ordered the Union Flag to be flown at half-mast on 8 July.
- On 9 July, the Bishop of London led prayers for the victims during a service paying tribute to the role of women during World War II.
- A Vigil for the Victims of the London Bombings was held from 5pm on Saturday 9 July, at Friends Meeting House garden, Euston Road, opposite Euston station, London, UK. The vigil was called by Stop the War Coalition, Campaign for Nuclear Disarmament and Muslim Association of Britain.
- A two-minute silence for the victims of the bombings was held on 14 July 2005 throughout Europe.
- On 14 July, thousands attended a vigil at 18:00 on Trafalgar Square. Following an initial silence there was a series of speakers for the next two hours. Chief Rabbi Sir Jonathan Sacks speaking of London said: "It has the courage not to give terror the victory of making us angry and in our anger lose the values that make us what we are. Let that courage unite us now." His words were echoed by many of the other speakers.
- A memorial service was held at St Paul's Cathedral, on 1 November 2005.
- A two-minute silence was held at 12:00 BST on 7 July 2006 across the country to commemorate those who died, or who were affected by the events.
- A permanent memorial was opened by Charles, Prince of Wales on 7 July 2009, four years after the bombings, in Hyde Park, London.

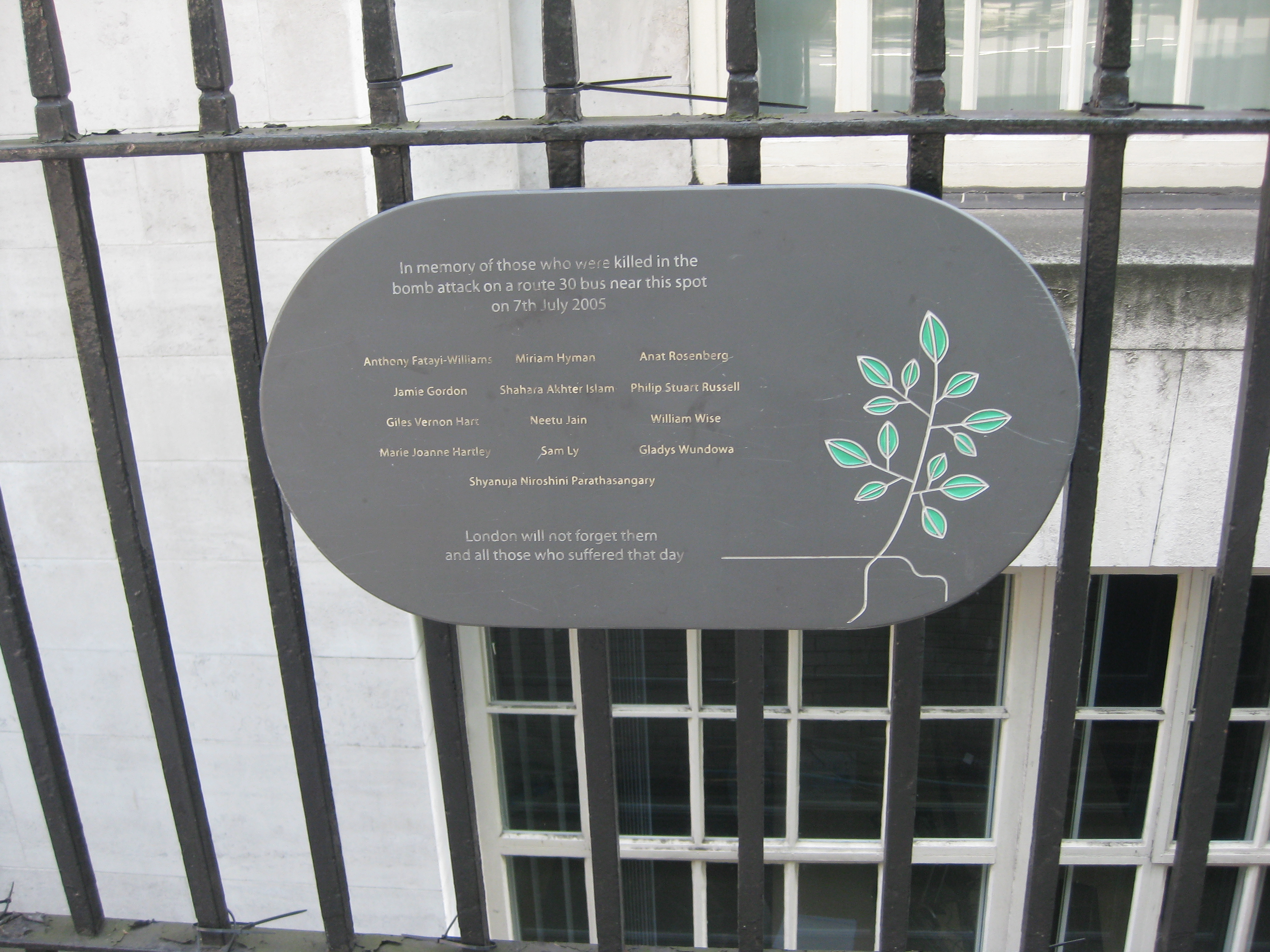
A plaque commemorating the victims of the Route 30 bus during the 2005 London bombings

- A second permanent memorial at Tavistock Square was dedicated on 12 September 2018.

== International ==
=== Condolence books ===
- New Zealand In Auckland, New Zealand, Prince William of Wales signed the book of condolence at the British consulate.
- United States In Washington, D.C., the U.S. Army band played God Save the Queen outside the British Embassy in Washington D.C. Dozens of flower bouquets and notes were left at the embassy with messages such as, "Today, we are all British". US President George W. Bush visited the Embassy on 8 July upon his return from the G8 summit, and signed the book of condolence. On 12 July, a Detroit Symphony Orchestra brass ensemble played God Save the Queen during the pre-game festivities of the Major League Baseball All-Star Game at Comerica Park in Detroit.

=== Flag half-masting ===
- Canada – All federal government buildings and establishments across Canada, including the Peace Tower, and in the United Kingdom.
- New Zealand – Prime Minister Helen Clark requested that flags in New Zealand fly at half mast the day following the bombings.
- France – President Jacques Chirac requested that flags in France fly at half mast for 3 days.

=== Moments of silence ===
- European Union – The European Parliament held a minute of silence to mourn the victims of the explosions.
- Poland – The Polish Parliament, Sejm lower house observed a moment of silence.
- Ireland – The Irish Government organised a two-minute silence on Thursday 14 July, at the same time as in the United Kingdom.
- Russia – Flowers were laid at the British Embassy in Moscow as a minute of silence was observed by both staff and locals, who held hands and formed a human chain in solidarity on 8 July 2005.

=== Services ===
- Spain – God Save the Queen was played at the changing of the royal guard at Plaza de Oriente in Madrid in memorial to the victims of the attack. The ceremony was attended by the British Ambassador, and members of the Spanish royal family. After the Madrid train bombings, the UK hosted a similar ceremony at Buckingham Palace.
- Australia – God Save the Queen was sung at a service at St. Andrew's Cathedral, Sydney. Prime Minister John Howard read a bible passage and Phillip Jensen gave a sermon on the problem of evil and what the Bible says about this.
