= Kerry Andrew =

English composer, performer and author

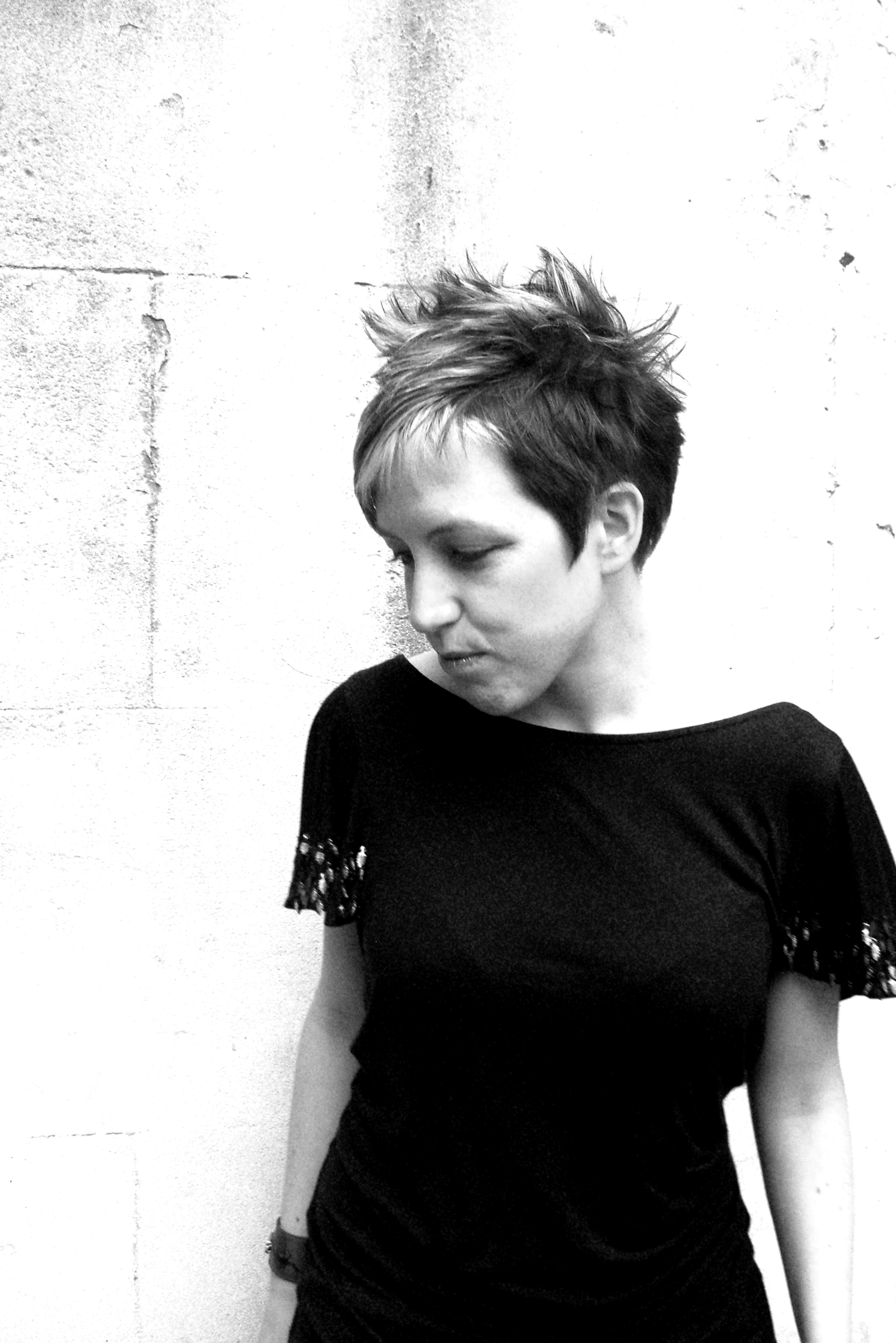
- Andrew in 2009

Background information
- Born: High Wycombe, Buckinghamshire, England
- Occupations: Composer, performer, author
- Website: http://www.kerryandrew.net

Kerry Andrew is an English composer, performer and author. They have won four British Composer Awards. They have published three novels and twice been shortlisted for the BBC National Short Story Award. They perform alt-folk music as You Are Wolf and have been a long-standing member of Juice Vocal Ensemble.

== Life ==
From age 3 to age 6, Andrew lived in Canada with their family. The family subsequently returned to the UK and settled in the Buckinghamshire area. Andrew earned a BA in Music, MA and PhD in Composition, all from the University of York.

== Career ==
=== Music ===
Andrew was Composer in Residence at Handel House Museum during 2010-12, and was Visiting Professor of Music at Leeds College of Music in 2015-16 and 2017-18. They won their first British Composer Award in the Making Music Category in 2010 for their choral work Fall, and won two awards in 2014, in the Stage Works category for their wild swimming chamber opera Dart's Love and in the Community or Educational category for their community chamber opera Woodwose, written for Wigmore Hall, and for which they also wrote the libretto. They won their fourth award, in the Music for Amateur Musicians category, for who we are, a piece for the massed National Youth Choirs of Great Britain, premiered at the Royal Albert Hall in 2016.

Andrew's No Place Like, was written for the BBC Ten Pieces scheme, and received BBC Proms performances in both 2017 and 2018. They have written large scale pieces for young and non-professional ensembles, including 400 Lewisham-based primary school children at the Royal Festival Hall; for Animate Orchestra, the Junior Trinity Symphony Orchestra and 500 singers of the South London Riverside Partnership at the Royal Albert Hall; and for the massed choirs of the National Youth Choirs of Great Britain at the Royal Albert Hall in their piece 'who we are.' They created a concept drawing and vocal EP A Lock Is A Gate for Art on the Underground in 2011, and a work simultaneously performed by 25 community ensembles around the UK for the Landmark Trust. In 2015, they wrote a piece for the London Sinfonietta to fight for the National Health Service (featuring the recorded voices of 60 members of the public, including actor/campaigner Michael Sheen) and another for them about the Covid experience in 2021. In 2019, they wrote the music for the National Theatre's Rutherford and Son.

Andrew was a British Council/PRS for Music Foundation Musicians in Residence in China in Spring 2016, spending five weeks in the Henan Province in 2016. They made collaborative new rock/traditional-inspired songs based on foxes in folklore.

Andrew's choral works have been published by Faber Music and by Oxford University Press, including in Carols for Choirs. Their vocal trio piece The Song of Doves concluded the national memorial service for the victims of the 7 July bombings, receiving national broadcast live on the BBC and other news outlets. Their composition Dusk Songs was commissioned and recorded by The Ebor Singers, and released by Boreas Music in 2007. Elsewhere, their work has been recorded on the Naxos and Nonclassical labels, and choral premieres have been given by the National Youth Choirs of Great Britain, The Hilliard Ensemble, ORA Singers, the Joyful Company of Singers and Alamire.

Andrew performs with the vocal trio Juice Vocal Ensemble, who have released two albums on the Nonclassical label, which include their music, as well as a collaborative album with David Thomas Broughton. They have collaborated with the likes of Anna Meredith, Gavin Bryars, Shlomo, Errollyn Wallen and Mica Levi.

They perform alt-folk under the name You Are Wolf. Their debut album, Hawk to the Hunting Gone (2014, Stone Tape), explored British birds and folklore. Their second album, Keld (Firecrest, 2018) was awarded fRoots magazine's Editor's Choice! Album of the Year 2018 and chosen by the Guardian as a Top Ten Folk Album 2018. They have collaborated with Robert Macfarlane and Jackie Morris, setting texts from their book The Lost Words and being involved in the first album The Lost Words: Spell Songs. Their third album, hare // hunter // moth // ghost (Firecrest, 2023) was the Guardian's Folk Album of the Month. In 2024, they collaborated with Hayden Thorpe and Robert Macfarlane on their album Ness.

They were a multi-instrumentalist with the band DOLLYman from 2007-18.

From 2007-17, they sang with Laura Cole's jazz ensemble, Metamorphic.

Andrew occasionally appears as a presenter on BBC Radio 3's The New Music Show and has been a frequent guest on BBC Radio 3 and 4, including The Essay in 2018, and a guest mix for Late Junction in 2017. They were the Chair of the Judges on BBC Young Musician 2018.

=== Literary ===
Andrew has written libretto for their own music-theatre works and articles for The Guardian.

Andrew's debut novel, Swansong, was published by Jonathan Cape in January 2018. Their second novel, Skin, was published by Jonathan Cape in 2021, and was chosen as one of Attitude Magazine's 30 'Game-changing novels of the last 30 Years' in 2024. Their third novel, We Are Together Because, was published by Atlantic Books in 2024.

They made their short story debut on BBC Radio 4's Stories from Songwriters Series in 2014. They were shortlisted for the BBC National Short Story Award in 2018 for their story "To Belong To", which was broadcast on BBC Radio 4, read by Tobias Menzies. They were shortlisted again in 2022, for their short story "And the moon descends on the temple that was". They won the Edinburgh Short Story Prize 2024 for their story, "The Coffin Path".

== Discography ==
=== Juice Vocal Ensemble ===
- Songspin (2010), Nonclassical
- Laid Bare: Love Songs (2014), Nonclassical
- Sliding the Same Way with David Thomas Broughton (2014), Song by Toad
- Snow Queens (2018), Resonus Classics

=== You Are Wolf ===
- hunting little songs, EP (2010), Mulberry House
- Hawk to the Hunting Gone, (2014), Stone Tape
- Keld, (2018), Firecrest
- hare // hunter // moth // ghost (2024), Firecrest

=== Choral ===
- Dusksongs, The Ebor Singers (2007), Boreas Music
- York Mass, The Ebor Singers, (2009), Boreas Music

=== DOLLYman ===
- DOLLYman (2010), self-release
- Have Yourself a DOLLY DOLLY Christmas (2013), self-release
- Ponderous Skiffle Rubbish (2015), self-release

=== Metamorphic ===
- The Rock Between (2011), F-ire
- Coalescence (2013), F-ire

== Selected publications ==
- Skin. London: Jonathan Cape. 2021. ISBN 978-1787331648.
- Swansong. Vintage. 2019. ISBN 978-1784704926.
- We are Together Because. Atlantic Books. 2024. ISBN 978-1805460183.
