= 7 July Memorial (Tavistock Square) =

Memorial in Tavistock Square Gardens, London

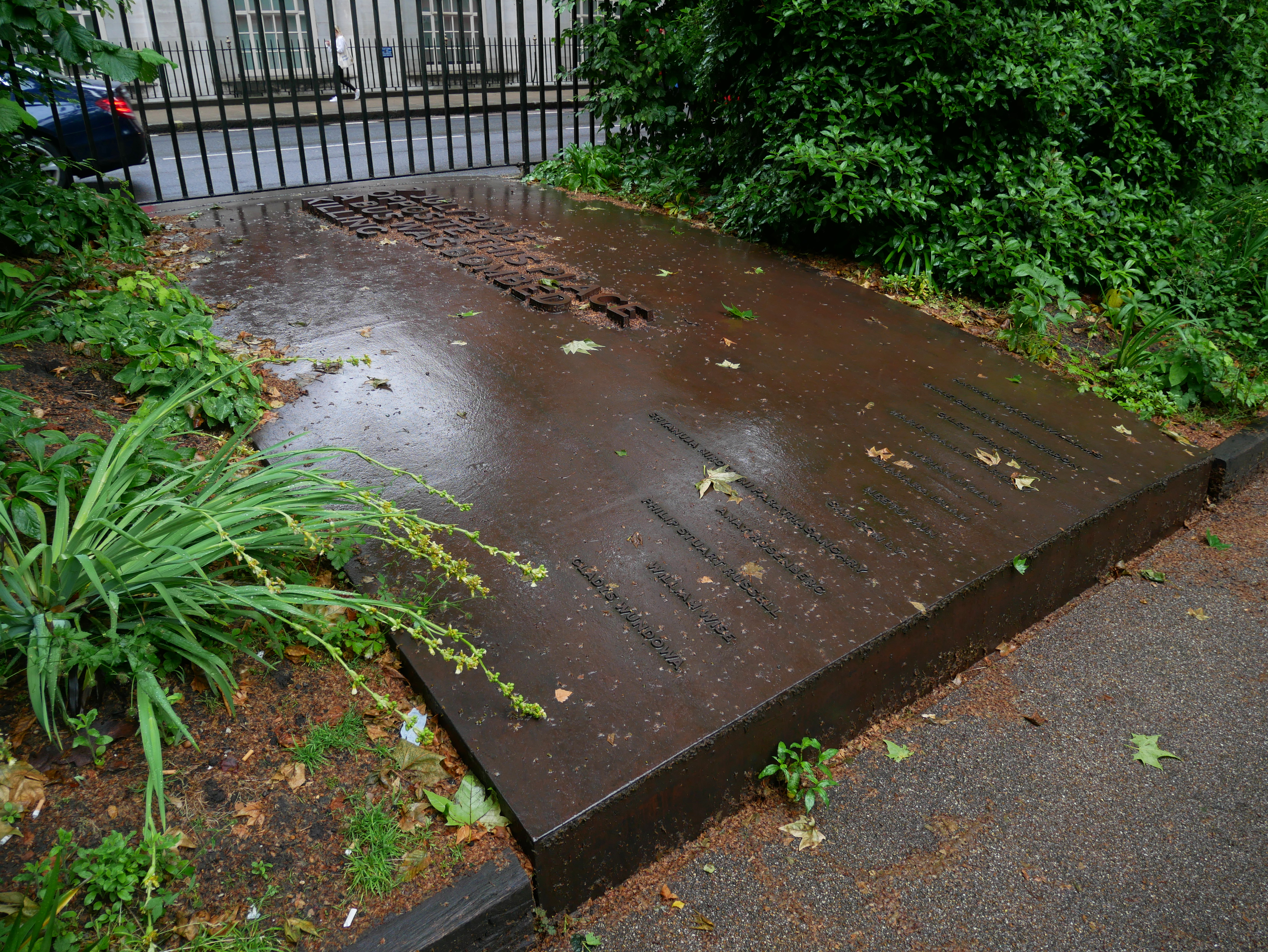
- 7 July Memorial in 2021
- Interactive map of 7 July Memorial
- Location: Tavistock Square, London
- Coordinates: 51°31′32″N 0°07′44″W
- Designer: Carmody Groarke
- Material: Pig iron
- Dedicated date: 12 September 2018; 7 years ago

The 7 July Memorial honours the victims of the 7 July 2005 London bombings at Tavistock Square which targeted London's transport system. Of the four bombings, the one at Tavistock Square was the only one above ground. The bomb was detonated on a number 30 double-decker bus, killing 13 people and injuring dozens. The memorial was dedicated in September 2018 with family members of victims among those in attendance. It was designed by Carmody Groarke, the same company to assist with designing the 7 July Memorial in Hyde Park. Inscriptions on the memorial at Tavistock Square include the names of the 13 victims.

== History ==
On 7 July 2005 a series of four suicide bombings by Islamic terrorists were carried out in London, targeting the city's transport system. Three of the bombings took place on London Underground trains and a fourth was carried out on a number 30 double-decker bus. The bus was traveling past Tavistock Square at the time of the explosion, tearing apart a portion of the bus. The explosion occurred in front of the headquarters of the British Medical Association, also known as BMA House, where medical professionals were able to assist victims. Thirteen people were killed in the bus bombing and dozens injured.

A memorial to the bus bombing victims was dedicated on 12 September 2018 and a one-minute moment of silence took place. Attendees included family members of victims as well as London Mayor Sadiq Khan. The chairperson of the 7/7 Tavistock Square Memorial Trust, established in 2012, said "It is hoped the memorial will be a focal point for the survivors, the families and also London's finest, our emergency services, who did what they had to do on that day. Above all it will send a powerful message that 7/7, and those who lost their lives, will never be forgotten." The daughter of one victim told a reporter "It's lovely to have something with her name engraved that will always be here, but you never expect to see the name of someone you love engraved in a memorial." During the 20th anniversary of the bombing, flowers were laid at the memorial, including by survivors of the bus attack.

== Design and location ==
The memorial is composed of 6 tonnes (6.6 tons) of pig iron, a material commonly used for industrial projects. It was designed by Carmody Groarke, the same company that assisted with designing the 7 July Memorial in Hyde Park. The lettering was engraved by Phil Baines. The inscription on the left side of the memorial reads: 7 July 2005 / OPPOSITE THIS PLACE / A BUS WAS BOMBED / KILLING, and on the right side the names of the 13 victims are inscribed.

The cost of the project was £130,000 of which £50,000 was contributed by HM Treasury. It is located on the edge of Tavistock Square Gardens, facing the site of the bombing, opposite the BMA House. Additional memorials and public artwork in the Gardens include the statue of Mahatma Gandhi, the Dame Louisa Aldrich-Blake Memorial, a bust of Virginia Woolf, the Conscientious Objectors Commemorative Stone and a tree planted in honour of victims of the bombing of Hiroshima.

Noting the location of the memorial, researchers Gérôme Truc and Nathan Bracher wrote "But of the four sites of these terrorist attacks, Tavistock Square was, unlike the tunnels of the underground, the only one in open air and easily accessible to the public, such that it is today also the only one where one can meditate and mourn, being certain that one is in the exact place where people lost their lives that day."

== See also ==
- 7 July 2005 London bombings memorials and services
- List of public art in the London Borough of Camden
