= 7 July Memorial =

Memorial in Hyde Park, London

Coordinates: 51°30′21″N 0°09′10″W

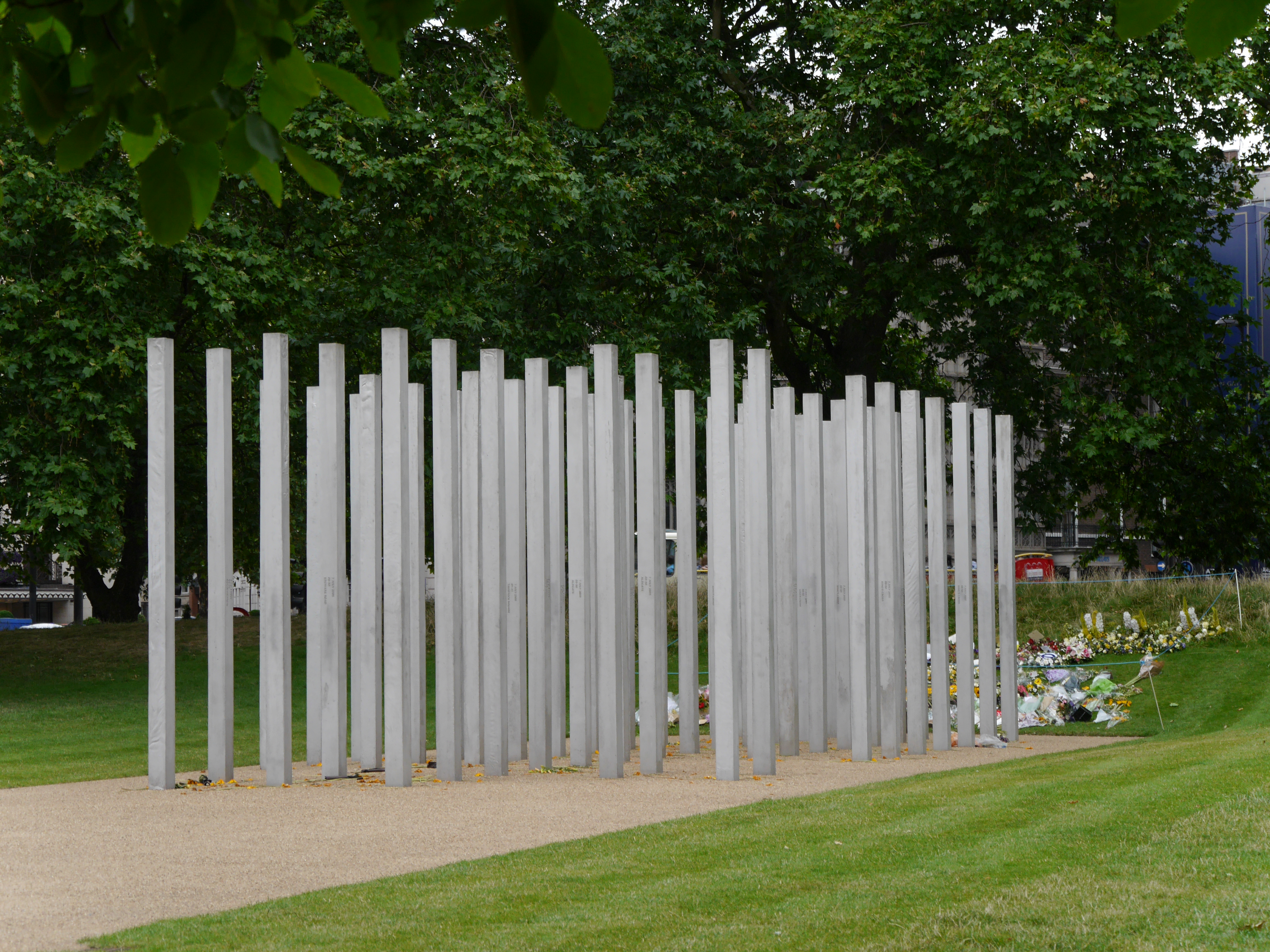
- 7 July Memorial in 2015
- Interactive map of 7 July Memorial
- Location: Hyde Park, London
- Material: Stainless steel
- Height: 3.5 metres (11 ft)
- Weight: 850 kilograms (1,870 lb) per stelae
- Completion date: 7 July 2009; 17 years ago

The 7 July Memorial is a permanent memorial to the 52 victims of the 7 July 2005 London bombings. It is located on the east side of Hyde Park, between Lover's Walk and Park Lane, close to Curzon Gate and about 150 metres (490 ft) north of the monumental statue of Achilles. A second memorial was dedicated at Tavistock Square in 2018.

== Design ==
The monument is made of 52 stainless steel columns (or stelae), each 3.5 metres (11 ft) tall and weighing about 850 kilograms (1,870 lb). The stelae are grouped in four linked clusters that reflect the four locations of the bombings at Tavistock Square, Edgware Road, King's Cross and Aldgate tube stations. The columns are anonymous, but each is inscribed with the date, place and time of the relevant bombing; a separate plaque lists the names of those killed. The form of the memorial, with many standing columns, has been compared to the Memorial to the Murdered Jews of Europe in Berlin, and the New Zealand War Memorial at Hyde Park Corner. A grass bank to the east of the memorial shields the site from the noise of traffic on Park Lane.

The proposal for a permanent memorial was announced on 13 February 2006, with £1 million of central government funding. The memorial was designed by a team including architects Carmody Groarke, engineers Arup, and landscape architects Colvin and Moggridge (see Brenda Colvin), advised by sculptor Antony Gormley, in consultation with representatives from the families of the victims, and also representatives from the Royal Parks and the Department for Culture, Media and Sport. The steel was cast by Norton Cast Products of Sheffield. Each pillar was cast in sand using the same mould, but using an open casting process that means each is slightly different, with a rough surface texture.

The proposed design was approved in November 2008, and the completed memorial was unveiled on the fourth anniversary of the attacks on 7 July 2009, at a ceremony attended by family members and relations of the victims and Charles, Prince of Wales, Camilla, Duchess of Cornwall, Prime Minister Gordon Brown, the Mayor of London Boris Johnson, and other political leaders and representatives from the emergency services.

The memorial was one of 102 structures given an award by the Royal Institute of British Architects in 2010.

== Vandalism ==
The memorial was defaced with graffiti two weeks after its dedication ceremony in 2009, with words written on the memorial with a black marker pen. It was vandalised for a second time in 2014, on the morning of the ninth anniversary of the attacks. In the 2014 incident slogans such as "4 Innocent Muslims", "Blair Lied Thousands Died" and "J7 Truth" were stencilled in red and black on the memorial, and were removed shortly after being discovered by the park's manager.

In June 2015, there were concerns that the site was being used by a group of rough sleepers.

== Gallery ==
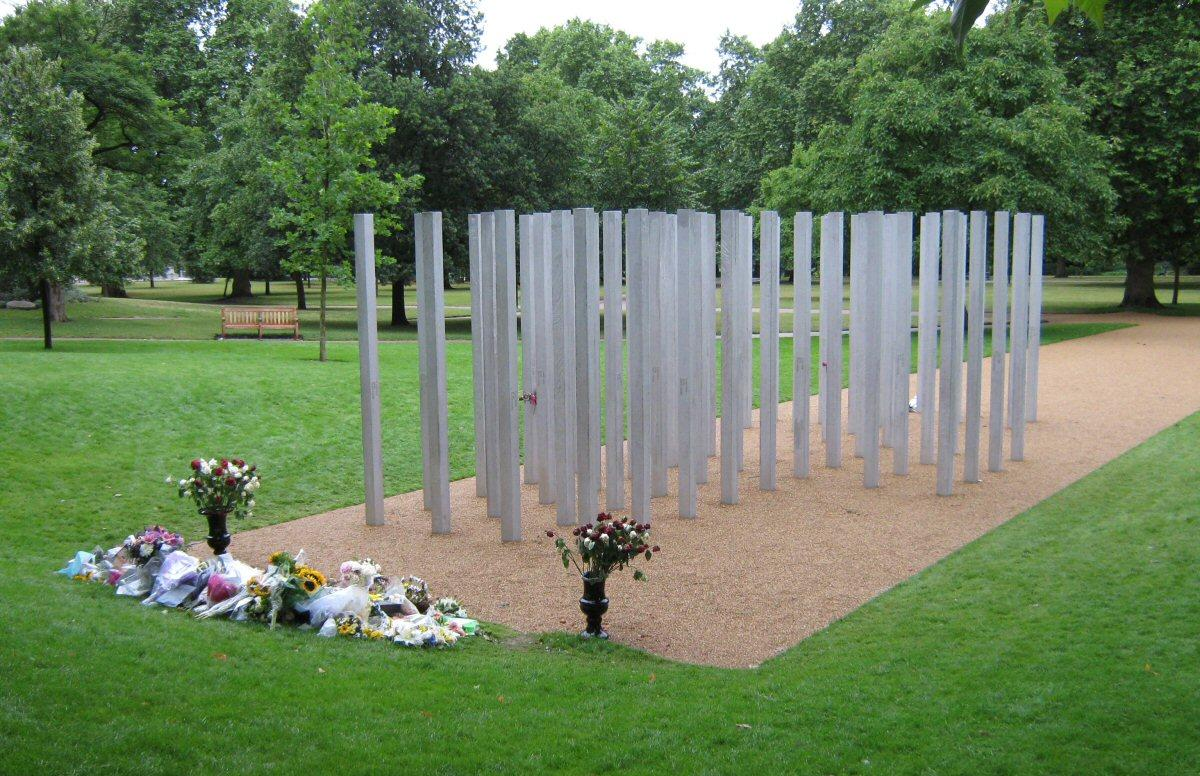
Memorial in July 2009, five days after it was unveiled

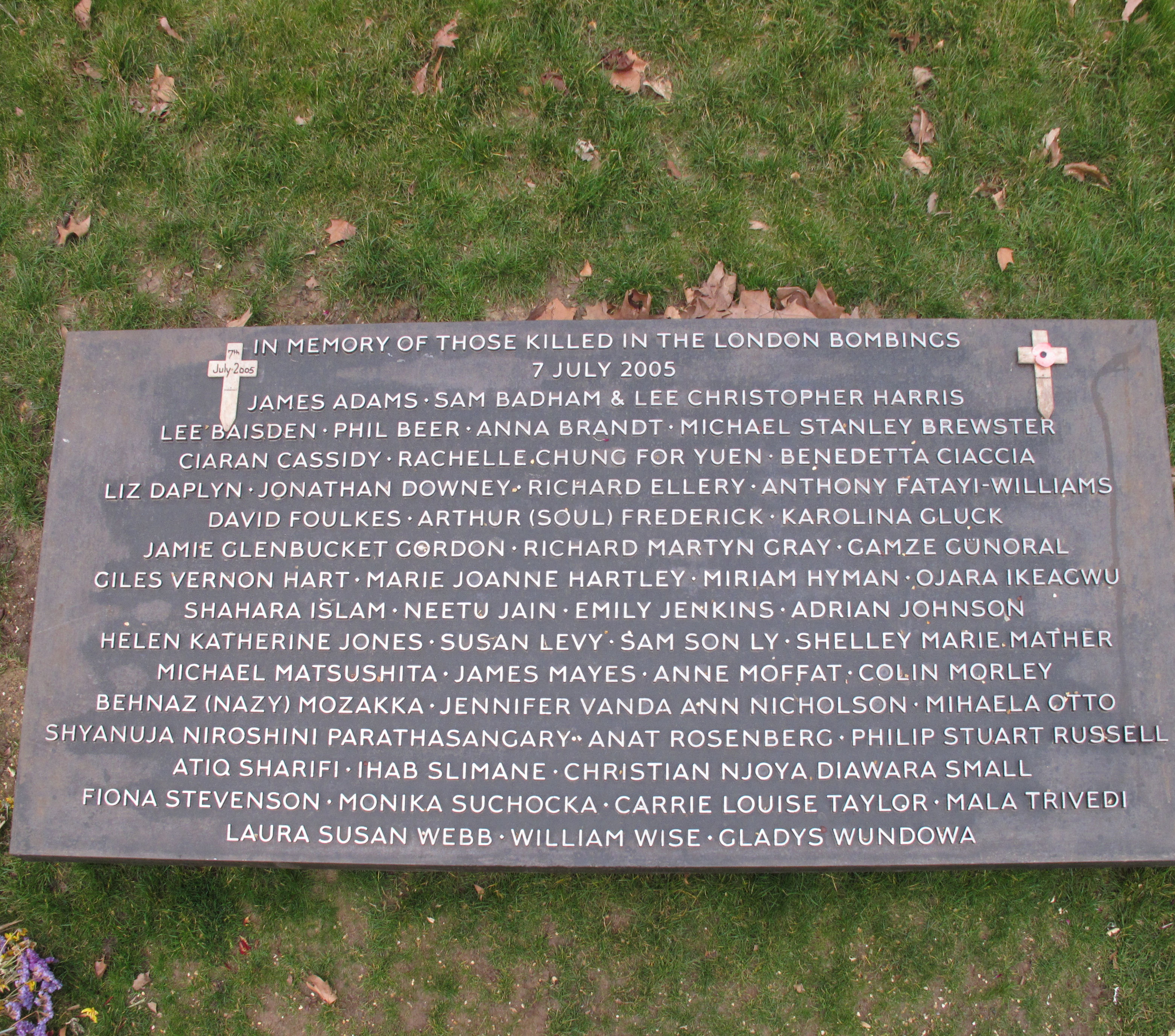
Memorial plaque

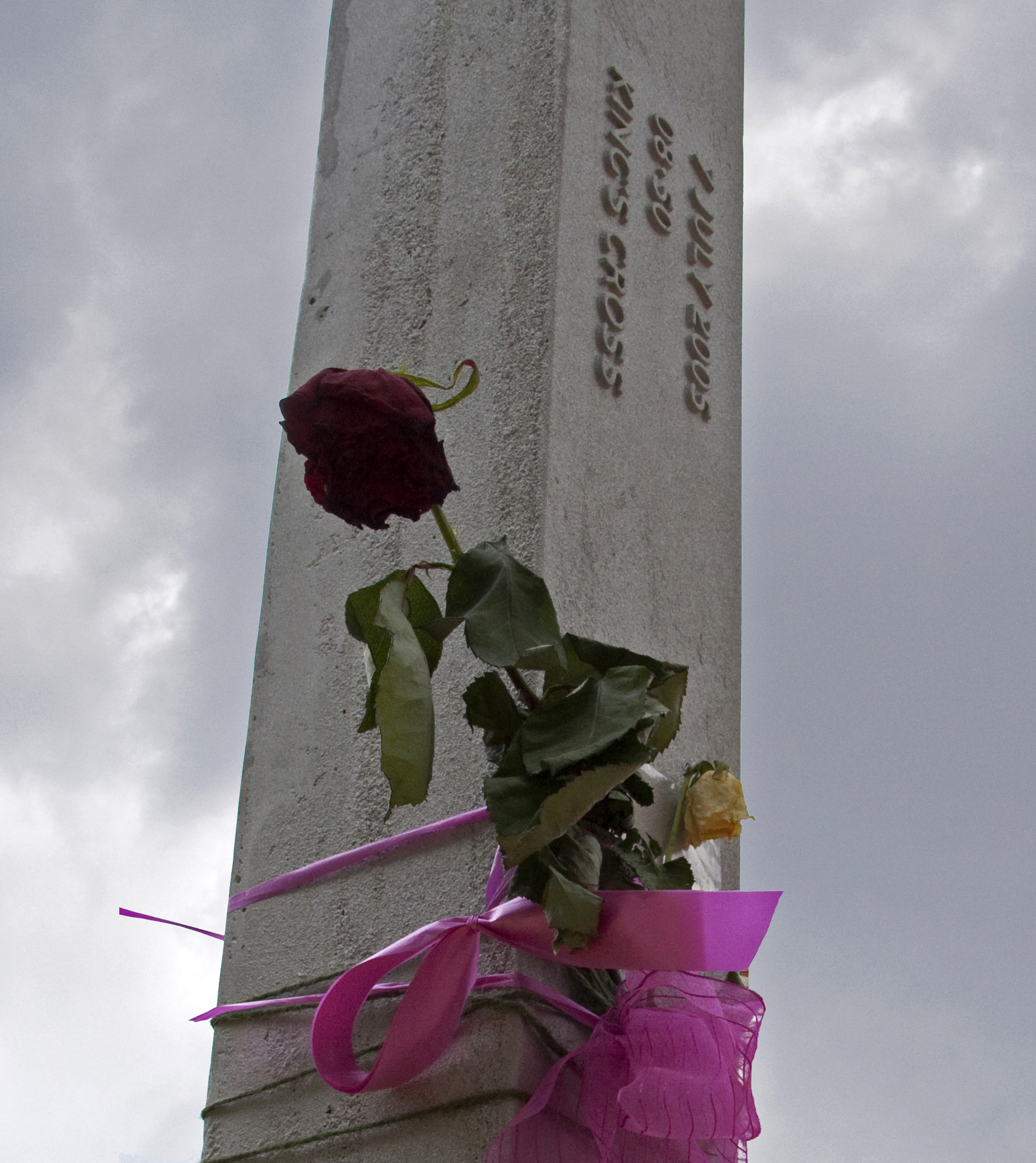
Floral tribute on a pillar

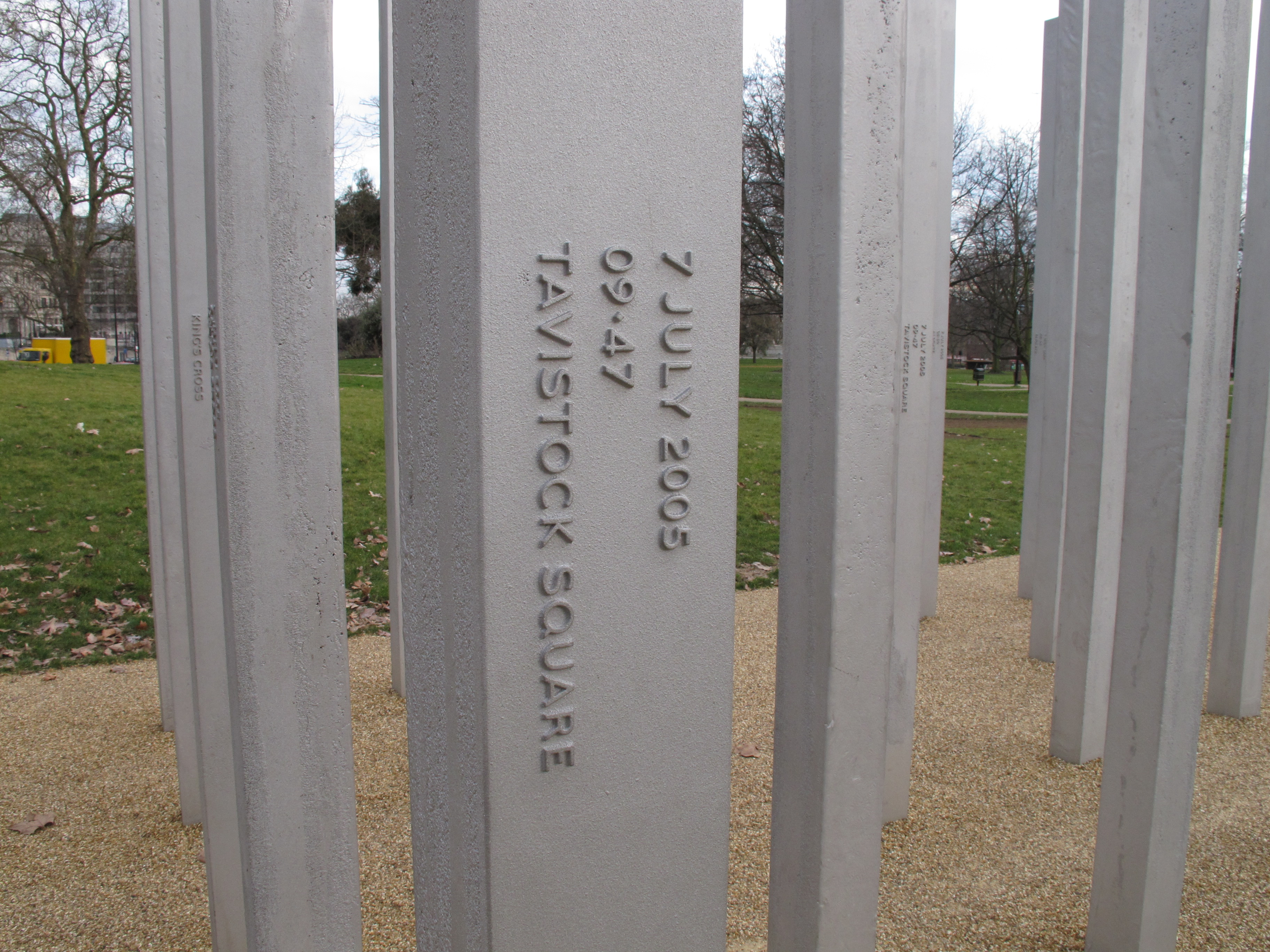
Detail on a pillar
