= Hyde Park, London =

Royal Park in England

Hyde Park
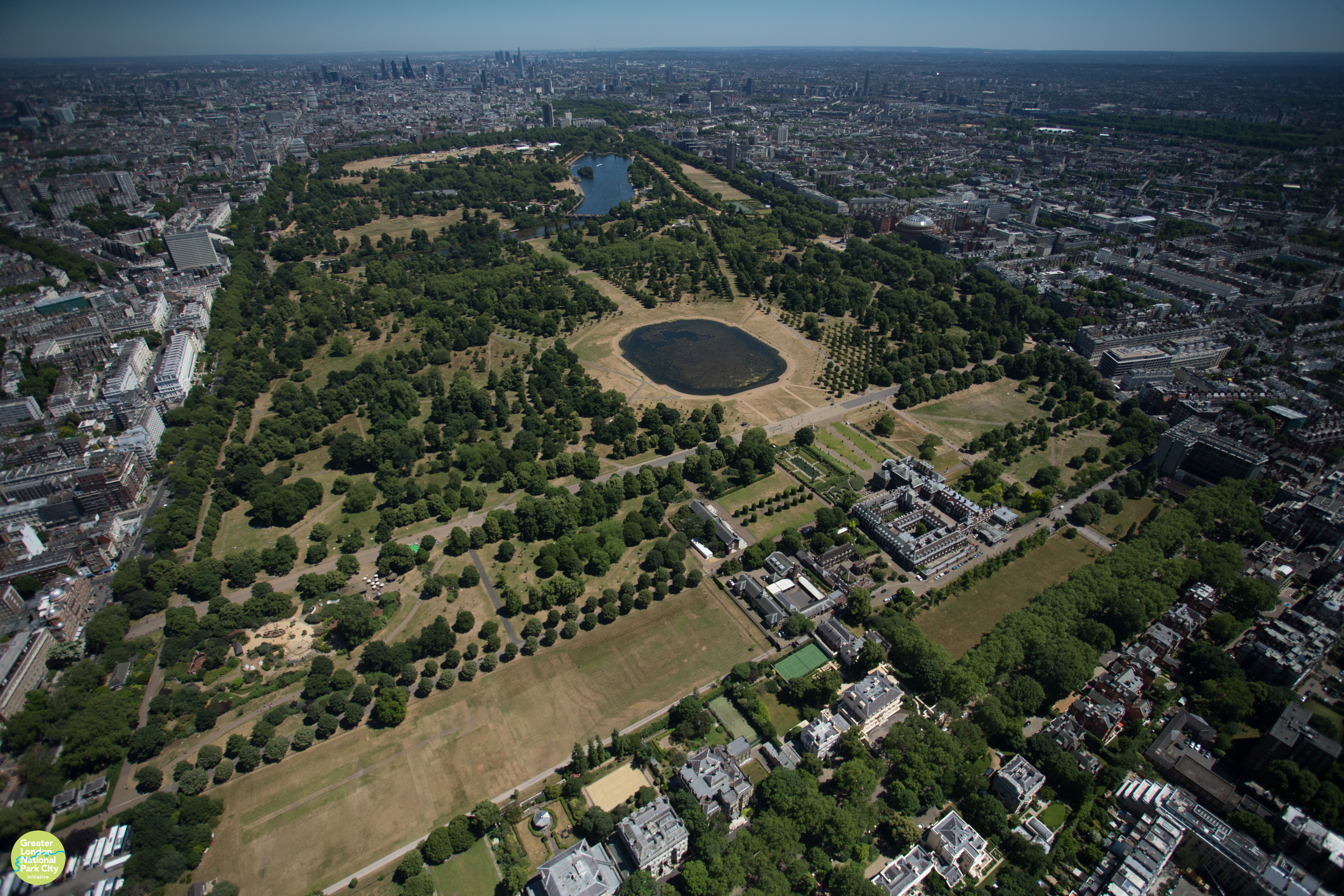
- Hyde Park, with Kensington Gardens in foreground

- Location within City of Westminster
- Type: Public park
- Location: Westminster, Greater London, England
- Coordinates: 51°30′31″N 00°09′49″W
- Area: 350 acres (140 ha)
- Created: 1637
- Operator: The Royal Parks
- Status: Open year-round
- Website: www.royalparks.org.uk/parks/hyde-park

National Register of Historic Parks and Gardens
- Official name: Hyde Park
- Designated: 1 October 1987
- Reference no.: 1000814

Hyde Park is a 350-acre (140-hectare), historic Grade I-listed urban park in Westminster, Greater London. A Royal Park, it is the largest of the parks and green spaces that form a chain from Kensington Palace through Kensington Gardens and Hyde Park, via Hyde Park Corner and Green Park, past Buckingham Palace to St James's Park. Hyde Park is divided by the Serpentine and the Long Water lakes.

The park was established by Henry VIII in 1536 when he took the land from Westminster Abbey and used it as a hunting ground. It opened to the public in 1637 and quickly became popular, particularly for May Day parades. Major improvements occurred in the early 18th century under the direction of Queen Caroline. The park also became a place for duels during this time, often involving members of the nobility. In the 19th century, the Great Exhibition of 1851 was held in the park, for which The Crystal Palace, designed by Joseph Paxton, was erected.

Free speech and demonstrations have been a key feature of Hyde Park since the 19th century. Speakers' Corner has been established as a point of free speech and debate since 1872, while the Chartists, the Reform League, the suffragettes, and the Stop the War Coalition have all held protests there. In the late 20th century, the park was known for holding large-scale free rock music concerts, featuring groups such as Pink Floyd, the Rolling Stones and Queen. Major events in the park have continued into the 21st century, such as Live 8 in 2005, and the annual Hyde Park Winter Wonderland from 2007.

== Geography ==
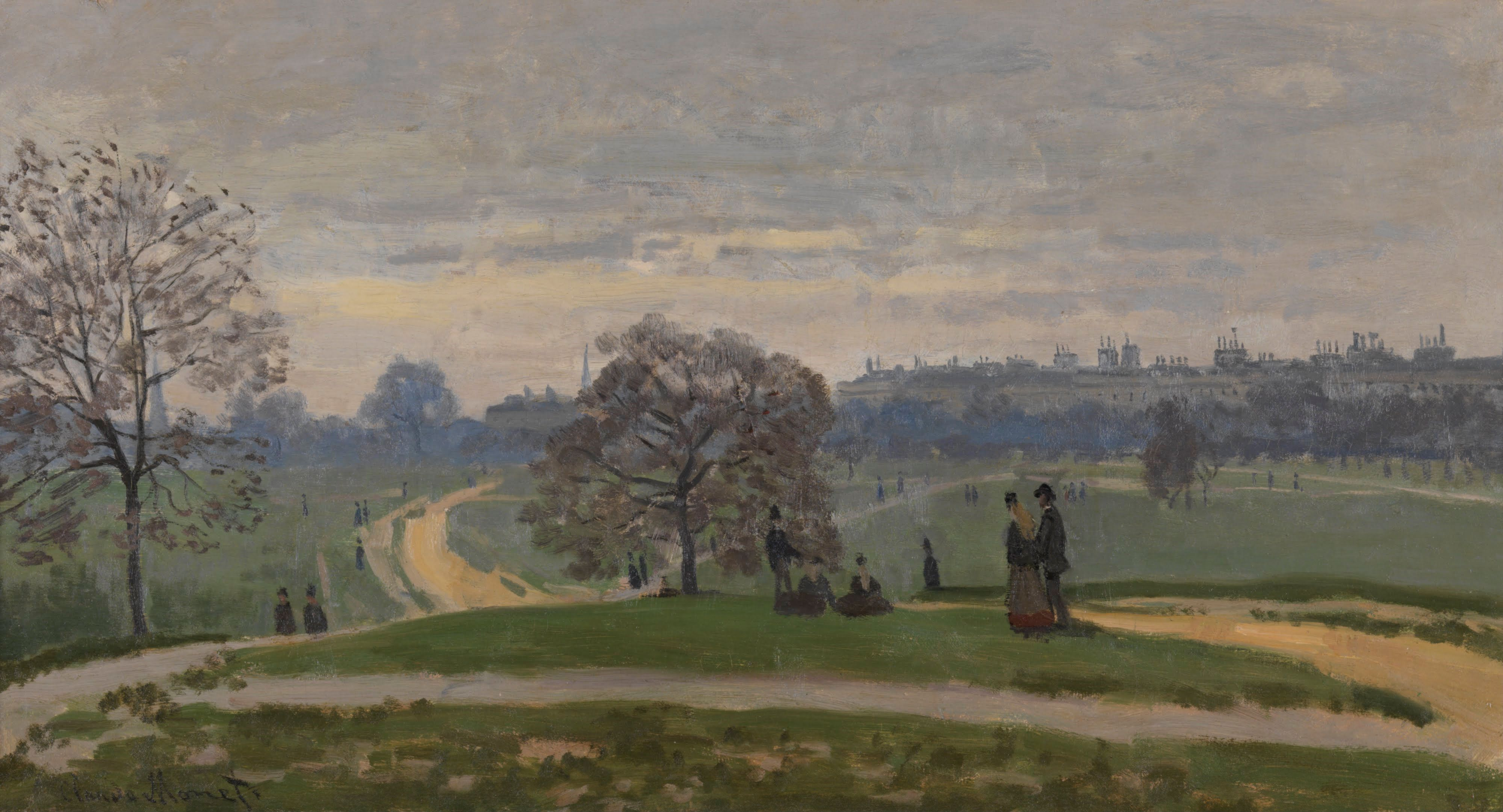
Hyde Park by Claude Monet, 1871

Hyde Park is a Royal Park in central London, bounded on the north by Bayswater Road, to the east by Park Lane, and to the south by Knightsbridge. Further north is Paddington, further east is Mayfair and further south is Belgravia. To the southeast, outside the park, is Hyde Park Corner, beyond which is Green Park, St. James's Park and Buckingham Palace Gardens. The park has been Grade I listed on the Register of Historic Parks and Gardens since 1987.

To the west, Hyde Park merges with Kensington Gardens. The dividing line runs approximately between Alexandra Gate to Victoria Gate via West Carriage Drive and the Serpentine Bridge. The Serpentine is to the south of the park area. Kensington Gardens has been separate from Hyde Park since 1728, when Queen Caroline divided them. Hyde Park covers 142 hectares (351 acres), and Kensington Gardens covers 111 hectares (274 acres), giving a total area of 253 hectares (625 acres). (Note: By comparison, the combined area of Hyde Park and Kensington Gardens is larger than the Principality of Monaco (196 ha or 484 acres), though smaller than the Bois de Boulogne in Paris (845 hectares, or 2090 acres), New York City's Central Park (341 ha or 840 acres), and Dublin's Phoenix Park (707 hectares, or 1,750 acres).) During daylight, the two parks merge seamlessly into each other, but Kensington Gardens closes at dusk, and Hyde Park remains open throughout the year from 5 a.m. until midnight.

== History ==
=== Early history ===
The park's name comes from the Manor of Hyde, which was the northeast sub-division of the manor of Eia (the other two sub-divisions were Ebury and Neyte) and appears as such in the Domesday Book. The name is believed to be of Saxon origin, and means a unit of land, the hide, that was appropriate for the support of a single family and dependents. Through the Middle Ages, it was property of Westminster Abbey, and the woods in the manor were used both for firewood and shelter for game.

=== 16th–17th centuries ===
Hyde Park was created for hunting by Henry Vlll in 1536 after he acquired the manor of Hyde from the Abbey. It was enclosed as a deer park and remained a private hunting ground until James I permitted limited access to gentlefolk, appointing a ranger to take charge. In 1612, walks were replanted with two hundred lime trees imported from the Low Countries and ponds were repaired. The work was supervised by Walter Cope. In October 1619, keepers directed by Sir Thomas Watson ambushed deer poachers with hail shot, and the poachers killed a keeper.

Charles I created the Ring (north of the present Serpentine boathouses), and in 1637 he opened the park to the general public. It quickly became a popular gathering place, particularly for May Day celebrations. At the start of the English Civil War in 1642, a series of fortifications were built along the east side of the park, including forts at what is now Marble Arch, Mount Street and Hyde Park Corner. The latter included a strongpoint where visitors to London could be checked and vetted.

In 1652, during the Interregnum, Parliament ordered the then 620-acre (250 ha) park to be sold for "ready money". It realised £17,000 with an additional £765 6 shillings 2 pence for the resident deer. Following the Stuart Restoration in 1660, Charles II resumed ownership of Hyde Park and enclosed it with a brick wall. He restocked deer in what is now Buck Hill in Kensington Gardens. The May Day parade continued to be a popular event; Samuel Pepys took part in the park's celebrations in 1663 while attempting to gain the King's favour. During the Great Plague of London in 1665, Hyde Park was used as a military camp.

=== 18th century ===
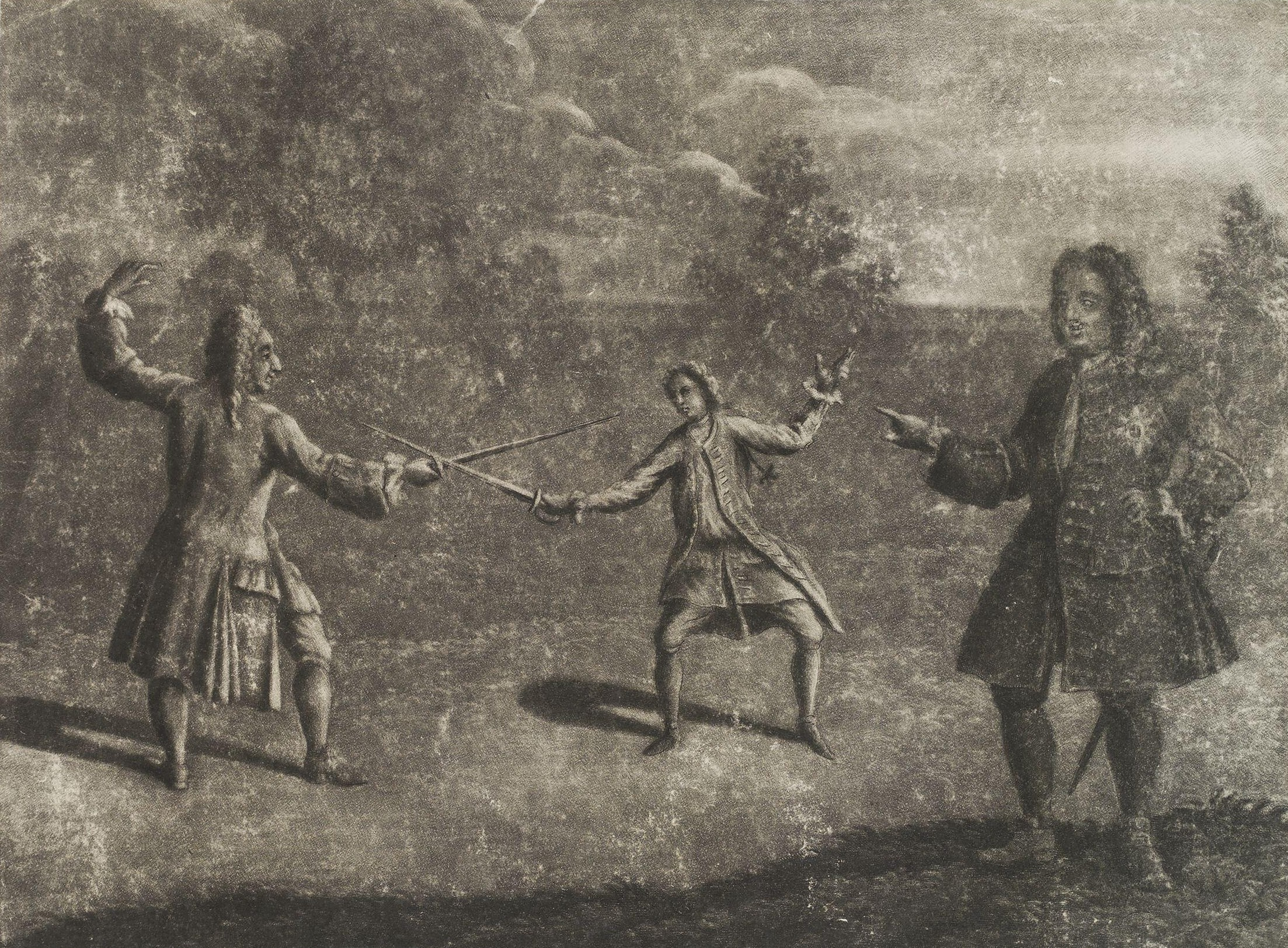
The Hamilton–Mohun duel, which was fought in Hyde Park on 15 November 1712

In 1689, William III moved his residence to Kensington Palace on the far side of Hyde Park and had a drive laid out across its southern edge which was known as the King's Private Road. The drive is still in existence as a wide straight gravelled carriage track leading west from Hyde Park Corner across the southern boundary of Hyde Park towards Kensington Palace and now known as Rotten Row, possibly a corruption of rotteran (to muster), Ratten Row (roundabout way), Route du roi, or rotten (the soft material with which the road is covered). It is believed to be the first road in London to be lit at night, which was done to deter highwaymen. In 1749, Horace Walpole was robbed while travelling through the park from Holland House. The row was used by the wealthy for riding in the early 19th century.

Hyde Park was a popular duelling spot during the 18th century, with 172 taking place, causing 63 deaths. The Hamilton–Mohun duel took place there in 1712, when Charles Mohun, 4th Baron Mohun, fought James Hamilton, 4th Duke of Hamilton. Baron Mohun was killed instantly, and the Duke died shortly afterwards. John Wilkes fought Samuel Martin in 1772, the year in which Richard Brinsley Sheridan duelled with Captain Thomas Mathews over the latter's libellous comments about Sheridan's fiancée, Elizabeth Ann Linley. Edward Thurlow, 1st Baron Thurlow, fought Andrew Stuart in a Hyde Park duel in 1770. Military executions were common in Hyde Park at this time; John Rocque's Map of London, 1746, marks a point inside the park, close to the Tyburn gallows, as "where soldiers are shot." (Note: This location is now where the A5 Edgware Road meets the A40 Marble Arch.)

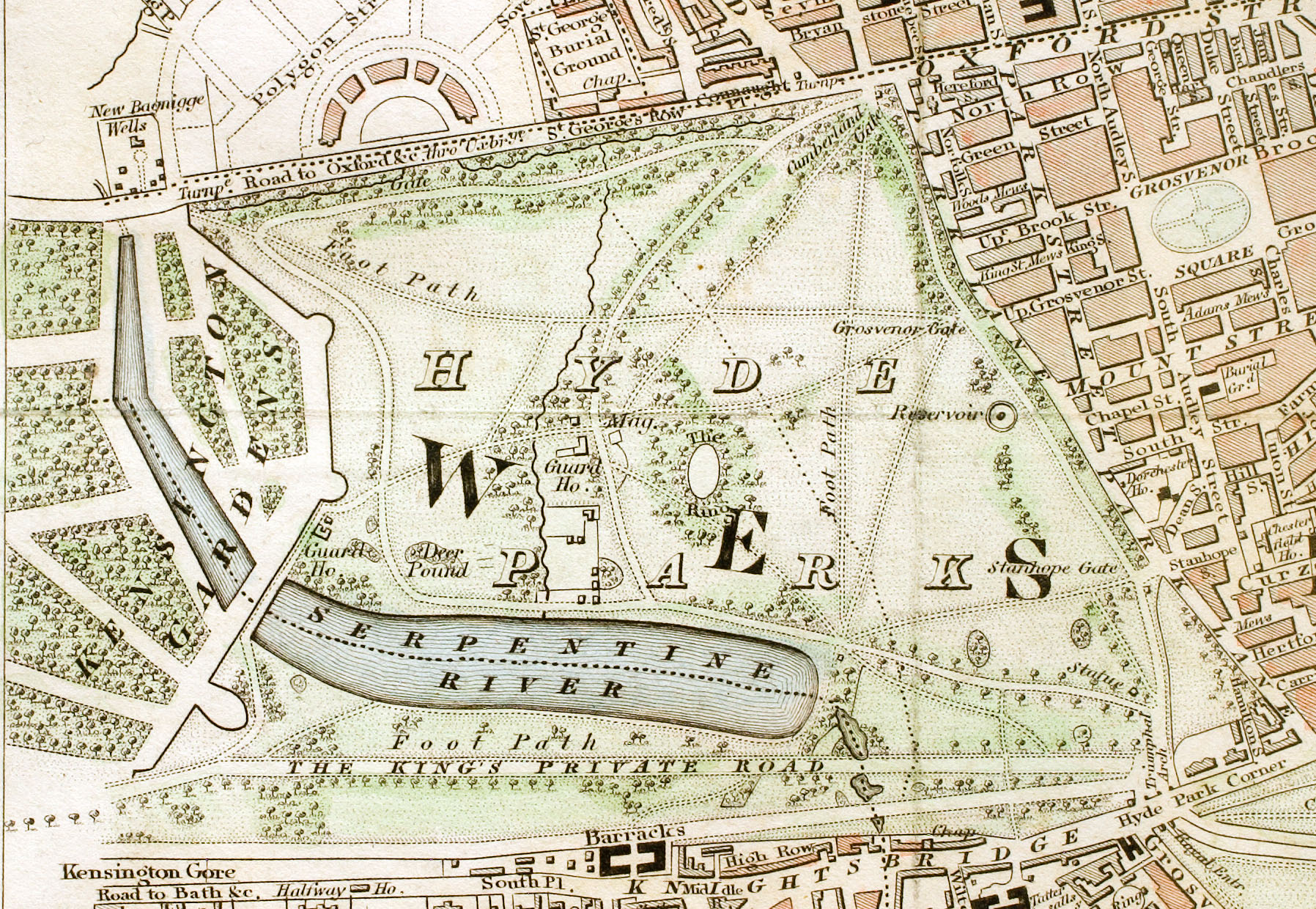
Hyde Park c. 1833: Rotten Row is "The King's Private Road"

The first coherent landscaping in Hyde Park began in 1726. It was undertaken by Charles Bridgeman for King George I; after the king's death in 1727, it continued with approval of his daughter-in-law, Queen Caroline. Work was supervised by Charles Withers, the Surveyor-General of Woods and Forests, and divided Hyde Park, creating Kensington Gardens. (Note: Bridgeman was Royal Gardener 1728–38; designed the Round Pond in Kensington Gardens. Peter Willis, Charles Bridgeman and the English Landscape Garden (London and New York) 1978, devotes a chapter to Bridgeman's Royal Commissions.) The Serpentine was formed by damming the River Westbourne, which runs through the park from Kilburn towards the Thames. It is divided from the Long Water by a bridge designed by George Rennie in 1826. The work was completed in 1733. The 2nd Viscount Weymouth was made Ranger of Hyde Park in 1739 and shortly after began digging the Serpentine lakes at Longleat. A powder magazine was built north of the Serpentine in 1805.

=== 19th–21st centuries ===
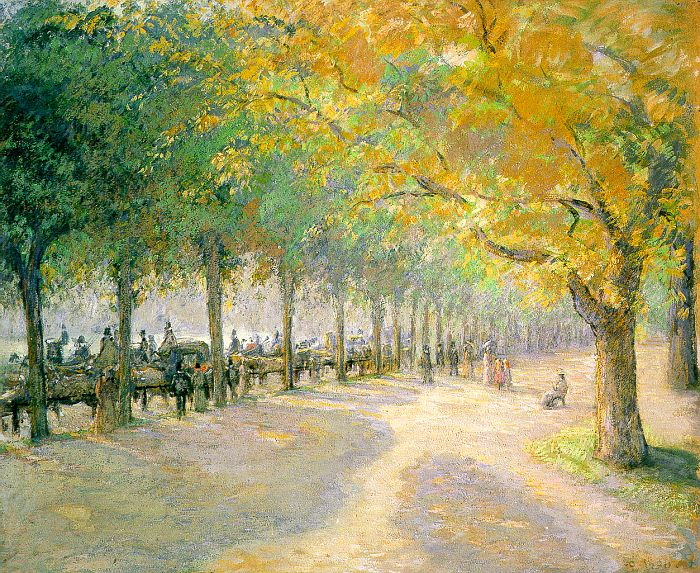
Hyde Park, 1890, by Camille Pissarro, showing the footpath along the southern bank of the Serpentine

Hyde Park hosted a Great Fair in the summer of 1814 to celebrate the Allied sovereigns' visit to England, and exhibited various stalls and shows. The Battle of Trafalgar was re-enacted on the Serpentine, with a band playing the National Anthem while the French fleet sank into the lake. The coronation of King George IV in 1821 was celebrated with a fair in the park, including an air balloon and firework displays.

One of the most important events to take place in Hyde Park was the Great Exhibition of 1851. The Crystal Palace was constructed on the south side of the park. The public did not want the building to remain after the closure of the exhibition, and its architect, Joseph Paxton, raised funds and purchased it. He had it moved to Sydenham Hill in South London. Another significant event was the first Victoria Cross investiture, on 26 June 1857, when 62 men were decorated by Queen Victoria in the presence of Prince Albert and other members of the Royal Family, including their future son-in-law Crown Prince Frederick William of Prussia.

The Hyde Park Lido sits on the south bank of the Serpentine. It opened in 1930 to provide improved support for bathing and sunbathing in the park, which had been requested by the naturist group, the Sunlight League. The Lido and accompanying Pavilion was designed by the Commissioner of Works, George Lansbury, and was half funded by a £5,000 (now equivalent to £283,000) donation from Major Colin Cooper (1892–1938). It still sees regular use in the summer.

Hyde Park has been a major venue for several Royal jubilees and celebrations. For the Golden Jubilee of Queen Victoria in 1887, a party was organised on 22 June where around 26,000 school children were given a free meal. The Queen and the Prince of Wales made an unexpected appearance at the event. Victoria remained fond of Hyde Park in the final years of her life and often drove there twice a day. As part of the Silver Jubilee of Queen Elizabeth II in 1977, a Jubilee Exhibition was set up in Hyde Park, with the Queen and Prince Philip visiting on 30 June. In 2012, a major festival took place in the park as part of the Queen's Diamond Jubilee celebrations. On 6 February, the King's Troop, Royal Horse Artillery, fired a 41-gun Royal Salute at Hyde Park Corner.

The Hyde Park (Underground Parking) Act 1961 (9 & 10 Eliz. 2 c. 26), an act of the Parliament of the United Kingdom was passed to authorise the use of royal estate land for the purpose of building an underground car park on the southern side of Hyde Park.

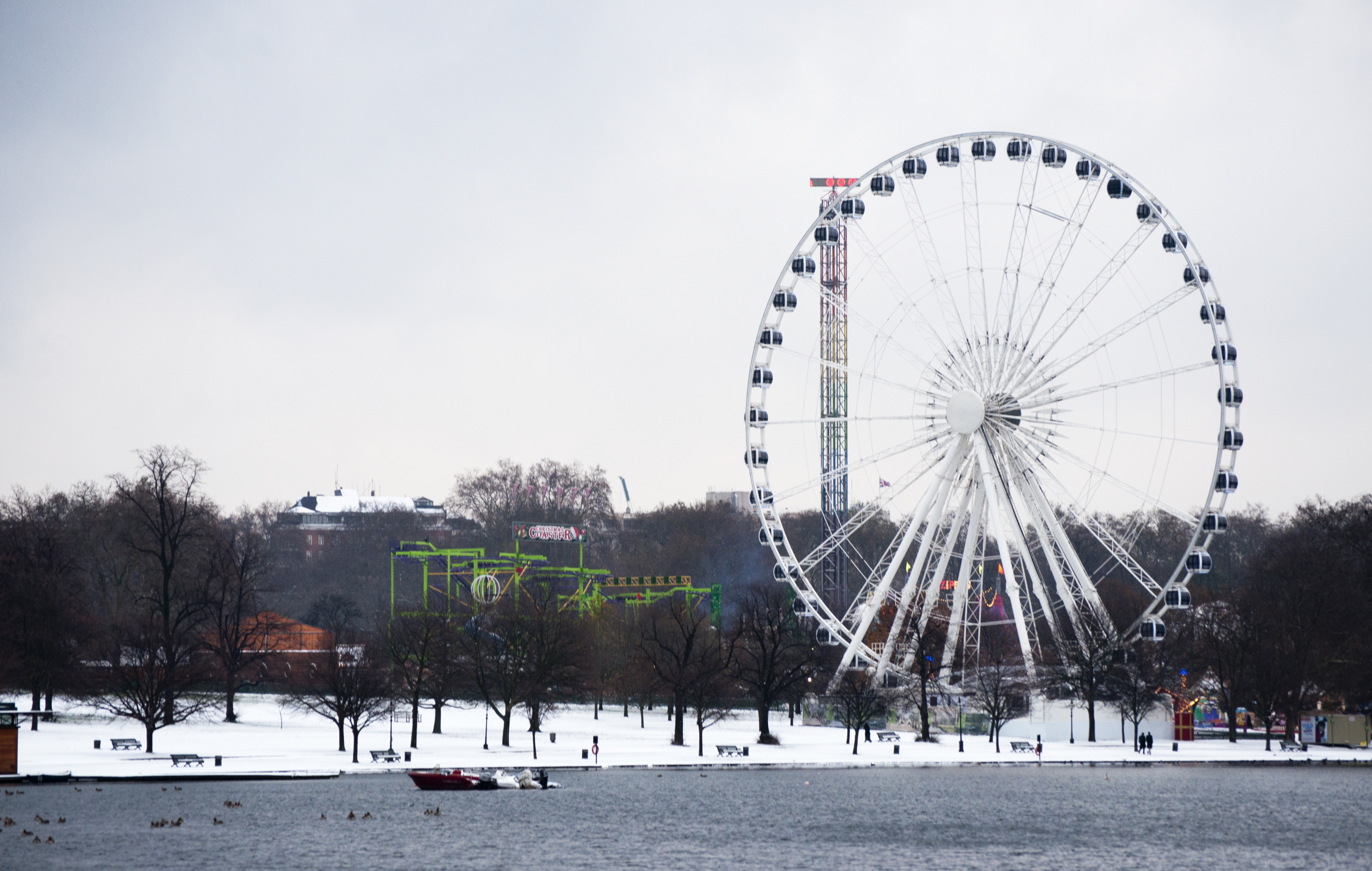
The Winter Wonderland festival has been a popular Christmas event in Hyde Park since 2007.

On 20 July 1982, a Provisional Irish Republican Army bomb killed four soldiers and seven horses. A memorial was constructed to the left of the Albert Gate to commemorate the soldiers and horses killed in the blast. Since 2005, Hyde Park has played host to the annual Winter Wonderland event. The event features numerous Christmas-themed markets, along with various rides and attractions, alongside bars and restaurants. It has become one of the largest Christmas events in Europe, having attracted over 14 million visitors as of 2016, and has expanded to include the largest ice rink in London, live entertainment and circuses.

On 18 September 2010, Hyde Park was the setting for a prayer vigil with Pope Benedict XVI as part of his visit to the United Kingdom, attended by around 80,000 people. A large crowd assembled along the Mall to see the Pope arrive for his address. An attempt to assassinate the Pope had been foiled after five people dressed as street cleaners were spotted within a mile of Hyde Park, and arrested along with a sixth suspect. They were later released without charge as police said they posed no credible threat.

Hyde Park was the site of a 2011 anti-austerity protest attended by the leader of the Opposition, Ed Miliband.

In 2015, the Guardian reported that EE had covertly built profiles of visitors to Hyde Park, with profiles including age, gender and location data.

== Grand Entrance ==
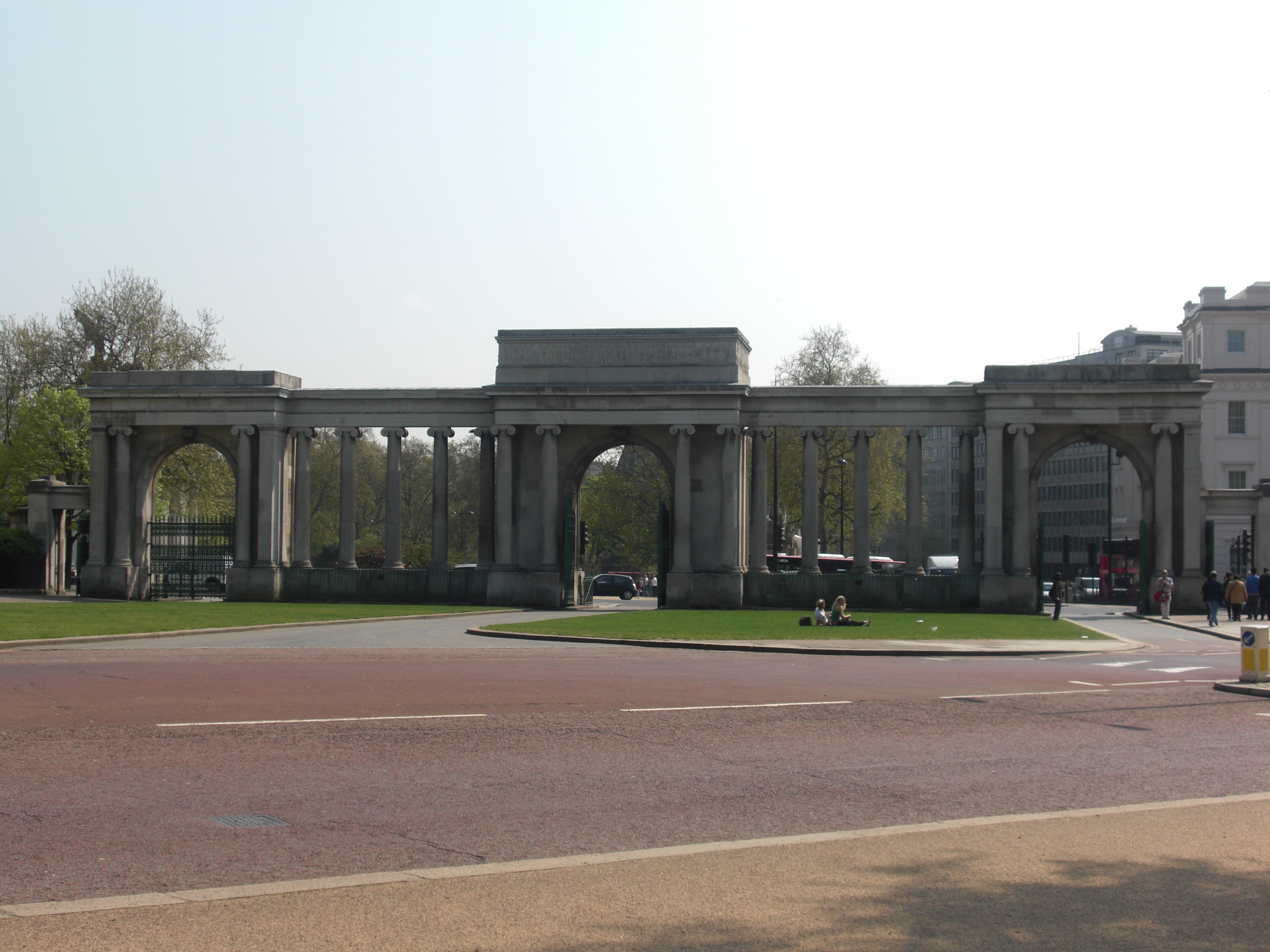
Decimus Burton's Hyde Park Gate/Screen

During the late 18th century, plans were made to replace the old toll gate at Hyde Park Corner with a grander entrance, following the gentrification of the area surrounding it. The first design was put forward by Robert Adam in 1778 as a grand archway, followed by John Soane's 1796 proposal to build a new palace adjacent to the corner in Green Park.

Following the construction of Buckingham Palace, the improvement plans were revisited. The grand entrance to the park at Hyde Park Corner was designed by Decimus Burton, and was constructed in the 1820s. Burton laid out the paths and driveways and designed a series of lodges, the Screen/Gate at Hyde Park Corner (also known as the Grand Entrance or the Apsley Gate) in 1825 and the Wellington Arch, which opened in 1828. The Screen and the Arch originally formed a single composition, designed to provide a monumental transition between Hyde Park and Green Park, although the arch was moved in 1883. It originally had a statue of the Duke of Wellington on top; it was moved to Aldershot in 1883 when the arch was re-sited.

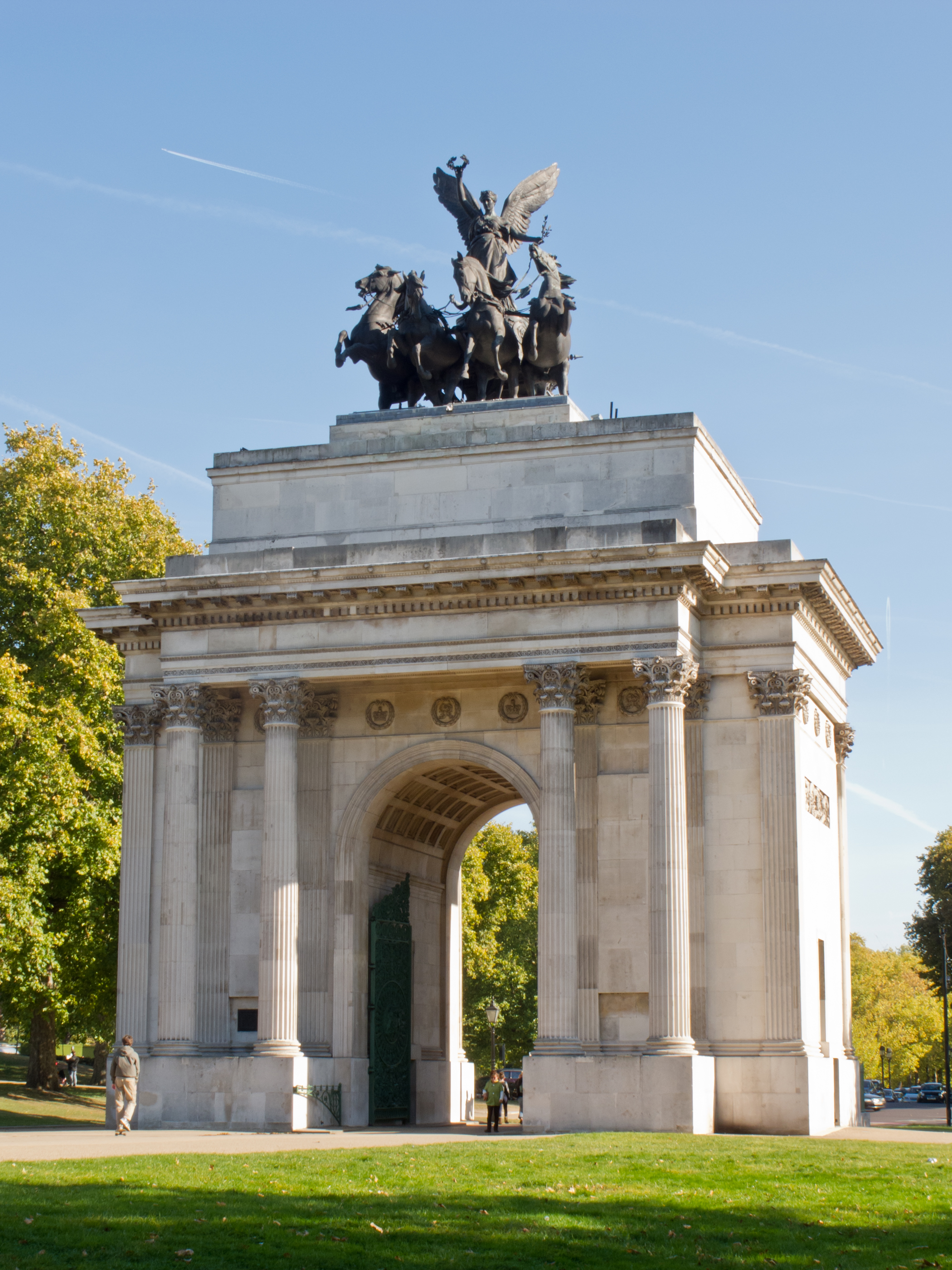
Decimus Burton's Wellington Arch, Hyde Park Corner

An early description reports:

"It consists of a screen of handsome fluted Ionic columns, with three carriage entrance archways, two-foot entrances, a lodge, etc. The extent of the whole frontage is about 107 ft (33 m). The central entrance has a bold projection: the entablature is supported by four columns; and the volutes of the capitals of the outside column on each side of the gateway are formed in an angular direction, so as to exhibit two complete faces to view. The two side gateways, in their elevations, present two insulated Ionic columns, flanked by antae. All these entrances are finished by a blocking, the sides of the central one being decorated with a beautiful frieze, representing a naval and military triumphal procession. This frieze was designed by Mr. Henning, junior, the son of Mr. Henning who was well known for his models of the Elgin Marbles. The gates were manufactured by Messrs. Bramah. They are of iron, bronzed, and fixed or hung to the piers by rings of gun-metal. The design consists of a beautiful arrangement of the Greek honeysuckle ornament; the parts being well defined, and the raffles of the leaves brought out in a most extraordinary manner."

The Wellington Arch was extensively restored by English Heritage between 1999 and 2001. It is now open to the public, who can see a view of the parks from its platforms above the porticoes.

== Features ==
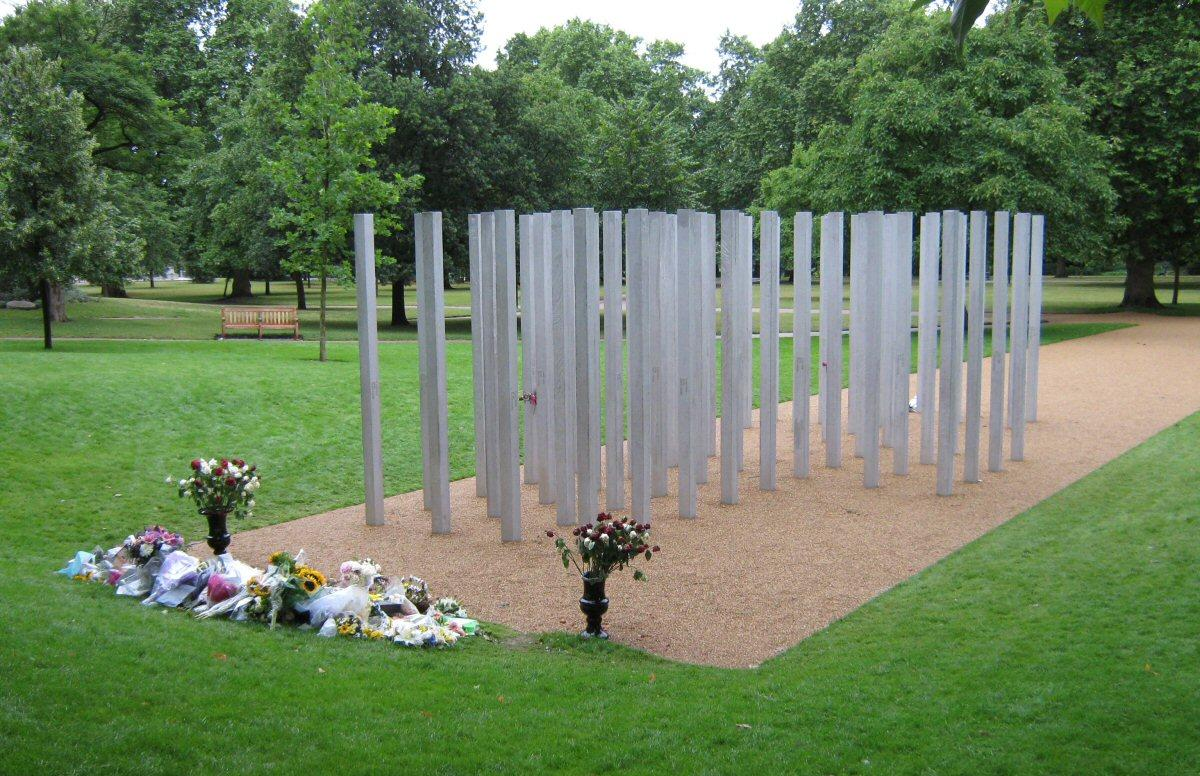
The 7 July Memorial to the victims of the 7 July 2005 London bombings

Popular areas within Hyde Park include Speakers' Corner (located in the northeast corner near Marble Arch), close to the former site of the Tyburn gallows, and Rotten Row, which is the northern boundary of the site of the Crystal Palace.

=== Botany ===
Flowers were first planted in Hyde Park in 1860 by William Andrews Nesfield. The next year, the Italian Water Garden was constructed at Victoria Gate, including fountains and a summer house. Queen Anne's Alcove was designed by Sir Christopher Wren and was moved to the park from its original location in Kensington Gardens.

During the late 20th century, over 9,000 elm trees in Hyde Park were killed by Dutch elm disease. This included many trees along the great avenues planted by Queen Caroline, which were ultimately replaced by limes and maples. The park now holds 4 acres (1.6 ha) of greenhouses which hold the bedding plants for the Royal Parks. A scheme is available to adopt trees in the park, which helps fund their upkeep and maintenance. A botanical curiosity is the weeping beech, which is known as "the upside-down tree". A rose garden, designed by Colvin & Moggridge Landscape Architects, was added in 1994.

=== Monuments ===
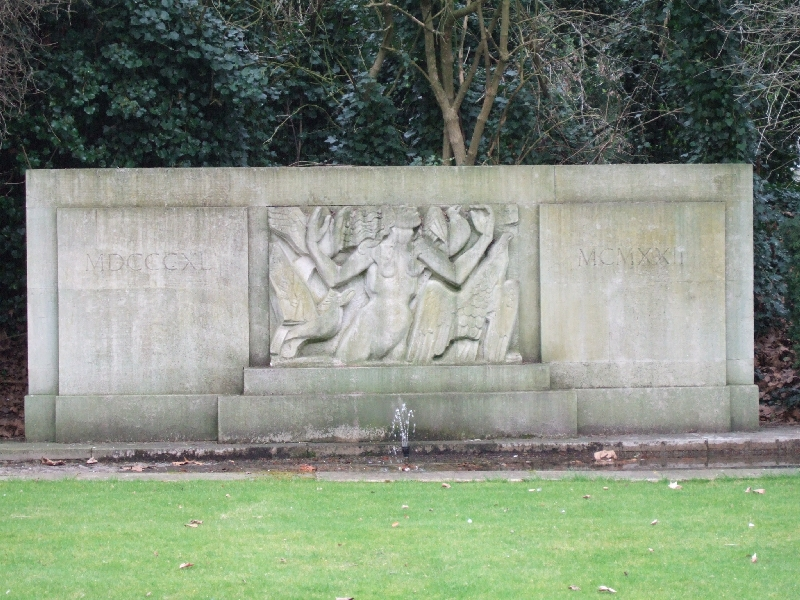
Jacob Epstein's Rima sculpture in Hyde Park

There are a number of assorted statues and memorials around Hyde Park. The Cavalry Memorial was built in 1924 at Stanhope Gate. It moved to the Serpentine Road when Park Lane was widened to traffic in 1961. South of the Serpentine is the Diana, Princess of Wales memorial, an oval stone ring fountain opened on 6 July 2004. To the east of the Serpentine, just beyond the dam, is Britain's Holocaust Memorial. The 7 July Memorial in the park commemorates the victims of 7 July 2005 London bombings. The Standing Stone is a 7 t (7.7-ton) monolith at the centre of the Dell, in the east of Hyde Park. Made of Cornish stone, it was originally part of a drinking fountain, though an urban legend was established, claiming it was brought from Stonehenge by Charles I.

An assortment of unusual sculptures are scattered around the park, including: Still Water, a massive horse head lapping up water; Jelly Baby Family, a family of giant Jelly Babies standing on top of a large black cube; and Vroom Vroom, which resembles a giant human hand pushing a toy car along the ground. The sculptor Jacob Epstein constructed several works in Hyde Park. His memorial to the author William Henry Hudson, featuring his character Rima caused public outrage when it was unveiled in 1925. There has been a fountain at Grosvenor Gate since 1863, designed by Alexander Munro. There is another fountain opposite Mount Street on the park's eastern edge. A pet cemetery was established at the north edge of Hyde Park in the late 19th century. The last burial took place in 1976.

=== Police station ===
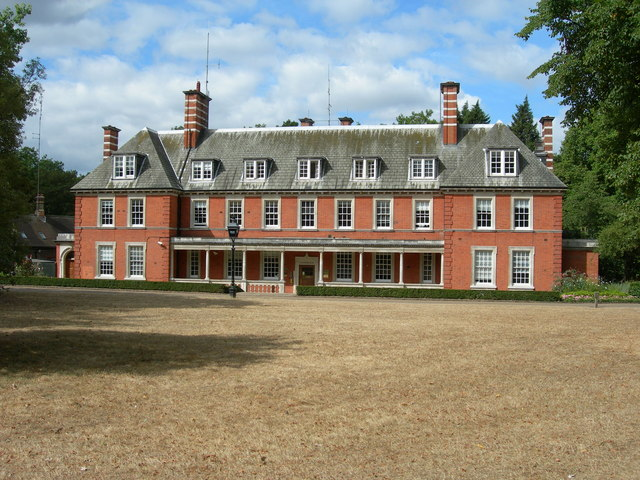
Hyde Park police station, c. 2006

Currently, the Metropolitan Police Service is responsible for policing the park and are based inside what is colloquially known as 'the Old Police House', which is situated within the park. The building was designed by John Dixon Butler, who was the forces's surveyor between 1895 and 1920. For the police, he completed around 200 buildings, including the Former New Scotland Yard, Norman Shaw South Building (assisting Richard Norman Shaw); the adjoining Canon Row Police Station; Bow Road Police Station, Tower Hamlets; Tower Bridge Magistrates Court and adjoining Police Station; and 19–21 Great Marlborough Street, Westminster (court and police station). The architectural historian describes the building as being like, from a distance, "a medium-sized country house of Charles II's time." Hyde Park was policed by the Metropolitan Police from 1867 until 1993, when policing of the park was handed over to the Royal Parks Constabulary. In 2004 this changed back to the Metropolitan Police, following a review of the Royal Parks Constabulary by Anthony Speed.

== Debates ==
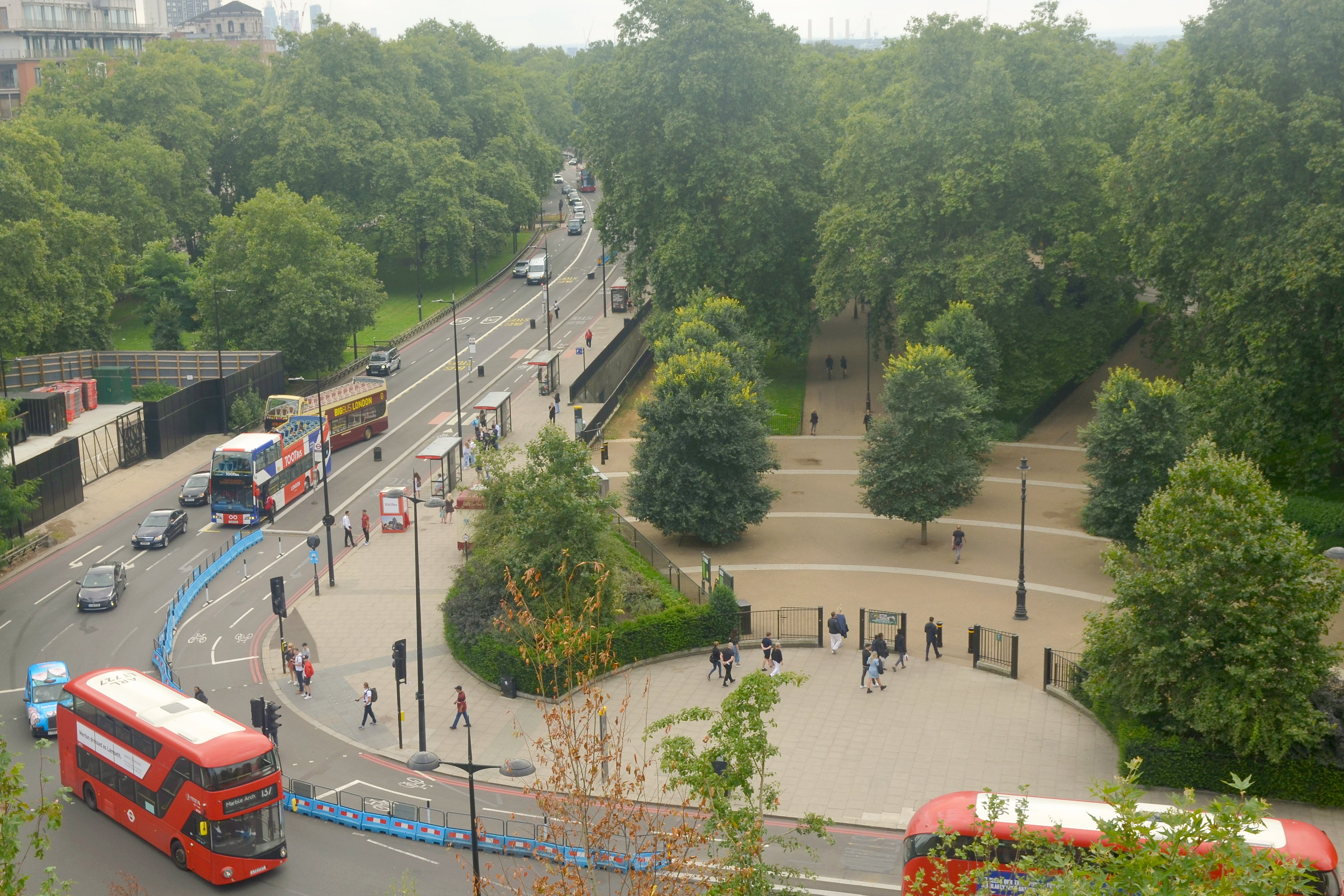
View of Hyde Park Speakers' Corner from the Marble Arch Mound

Hyde Park's Speakers' Corner has acquired an international reputation for demonstrations and other protests due to its tolerance of free speech. In 1855, a protest at the park was organised to demonstrate against Robert Grosvenor's attempt to ban Sunday trading, including a restriction on pub opening times. Karl Marx observed that approximately 200,000 protesters attended the demonstration, which involved jeering and taunting at upper-class horse carriages. A further protest occurred a week later, but this time the police attacked the crowd.

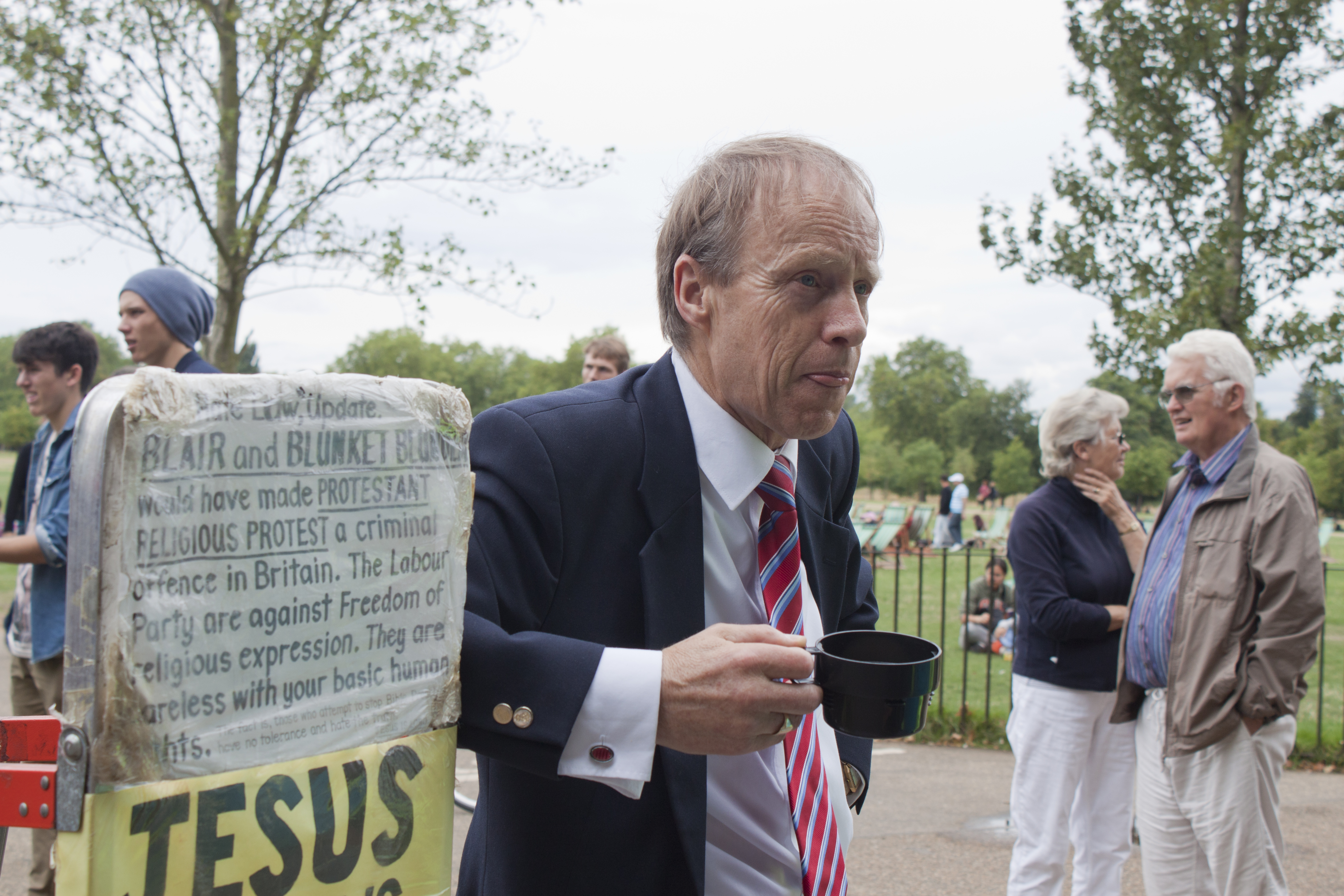
A Protestant Christian protesting at Speakers' Corner in 2010

In 1867 the policing of the park was entrusted to the Metropolitan Police, the only royal park so managed, due to the potential for trouble at Speakers' Corner. A Metropolitan Police station ('AH') is situated in the middle of the park. Covering Hyde Park and sixteen other royal parks (mostly in London), the 1872 Parks Regulation Act formalised the position of "park keeper" and also provided that "Every police constable belonging to the police force of the district in which any park, garden, or possession to which this Act applies is situate shall have the powers, privileges, and immunities of a park-keeper within such park, garden, or possession."

Speakers' Corner became increasingly popular in the late 19th century. Visitors brought along placards, stepladders and soap boxes in order to stand out from others, while heckling of speakers was popular. The rise of the Internet, particularly blogs, has diminished the importance of Speakers' Corner as a political platform, and it is increasingly seen as simply a tourist attraction.

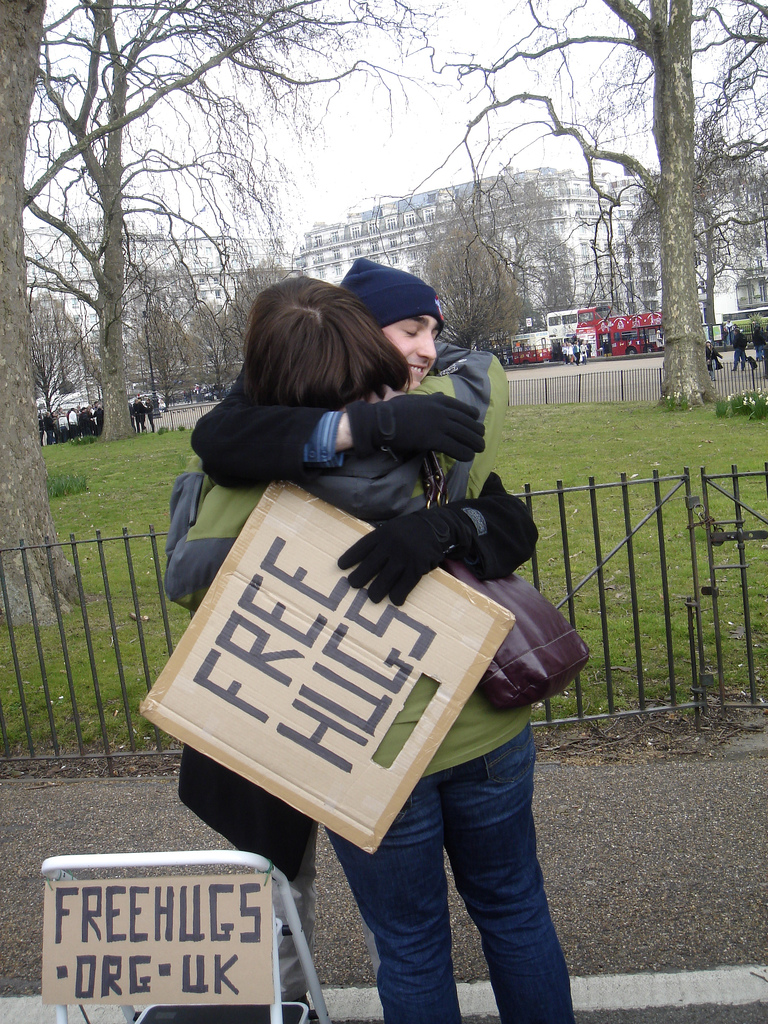
The Free Hugs Campaign has taken place several times at Speakers' Corner.

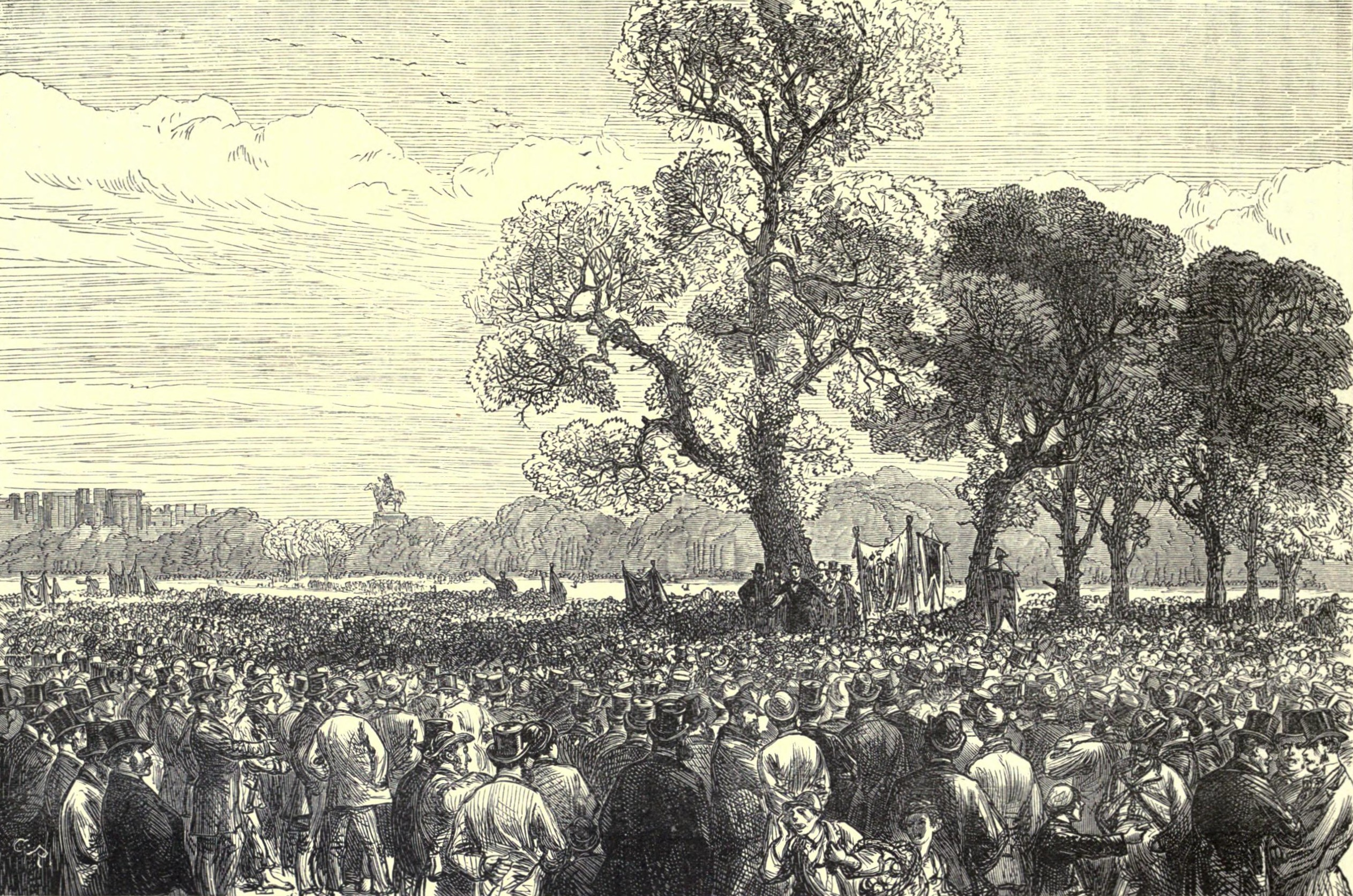
Meeting at the Reformers tree, 1867

As well as Speakers' Corner, several important mass demonstrations have occurred in Hyde Park. On 26 July 1886, the Reform League staged a march from their headquarters towards the park, campaigning for increased suffrage and representation. Though the police had closed the park, the crowd managed to break down the perimeter railings and get inside, leading to the event being dubbed "The Hyde Park Railings Affair". After the protests turned violent, three squadrons of Horse Guards and numerous Foot Guards were sent out from Marble Arch to combat the situation.

On 21 June 1908, as part of "Women's Sunday", a reported 750,000 people marched from the Embankment to Hyde Park protesting for votes for women. The first protest against the planned 2003 invasion of Iraq took place in Hyde Park on 28 September 2002, with 150,000–350,000 in attendance. A further series of demonstrations happened around the world, culminating in the 15 February 2003 anti-war protests, part of a global demonstration against the Iraq War. Over a million protesters are reported to have attended the Hyde Park event alone.

== Concerts ==
The bandstand in Hyde Park was built in Kensington Gardens in 1869 and moved to its present location in 1886. It became a popular place for concerts in the 1890s, featuring up to three every week. Military and brass bands continued to play there into the 20th century.

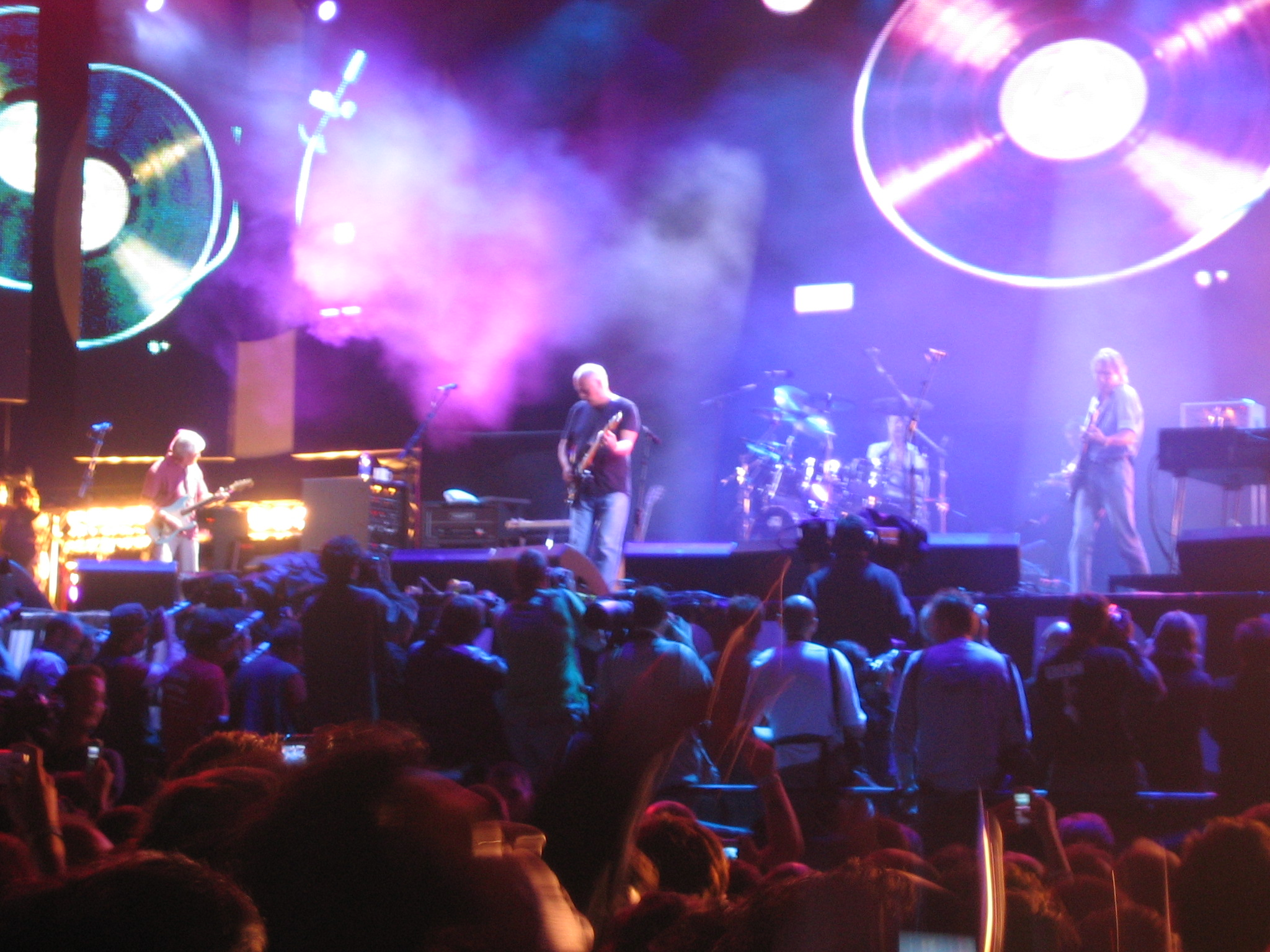
Pink Floyd performing at Live 8 in Hyde Park, 2 July 2005, their last of several gigs at the park over their career

The music management company Blackhill Enterprises held the first rock concert in Hyde Park on 29 June 1968, attended by 15,000 people. On the bill were Pink Floyd, Roy Harper and Jethro Tull, while John Peel later said it was "the nicest concert I've ever been to". Subsequently, Hyde Park has featured some of the most significant concerts in rock. The supergroup Blind Faith (featuring Eric Clapton and Steve Winwood) played their debut gig in Hyde Park on 7 June 1969. The Rolling Stones headlined a concert (later released as The Stones in the Park) on 5 July that year, two days after the death of founding member Brian Jones, and is now remembered as one of the most famous gigs of the 1960s. Pink Floyd returned to Hyde Park on 18 July 1970, playing new material from Atom Heart Mother. All of the early gigs from 1968 to 1971 were free events, contrasting sharply with the later commercial endeavours.

Queen played a free concert organised by Richard Branson in the park on 18 September 1976, partway through recording the album A Day at the Races. The band drew an audience of 150,000 – 200,000, which remains the largest crowd for a Hyde Park concert. The group were not allowed to play an encore, and police threatened to arrest frontman Freddie Mercury if he attempted to do so.

The British Live 8 concert took place in Hyde Park on 2 July 2005, as a concert organised by Bob Geldof and Midge Ure to raise awareness of increased debts and poverty in the third world. Acts included U2, Coldplay, Elton John, R.E.M., Madonna, The Who, and Paul McCartney, and the most anticipated set was the reformation of the classic 1970s line-up of Pink Floyd (including David Gilmour and Roger Waters) for the first time since 1981. The gig was the Floyd's final live performance.

Acts from each of the four nations in the UK played a gig in the park as part of the opening ceremony for the 2012 Summer Olympics. The headliners were Duran Duran, representing England, alongside the Stereophonics for Wales, Paolo Nutini for Scotland, and Snow Patrol for Northern Ireland. Since 2011, Radio 2 Live in Hyde Park has taken place each September. Hyde Park host the annual music festival BST Hyde Park, headlined by artists including Adele, Arcade Fire, Sabrina Carpenter, Guns N' Roses, Lana Del Rey, Taylor Swift and Olivia Rodrigo Local residents have become critical of Hyde Park as a concert venue, due to the sound levels, and have campaigned for a maximum sound level of 73 decibels. In July 2012, Bruce Springsteen and Paul McCartney found their microphones switched off after Springsteen had played a three-hour set during the Park's Hard Rock Calling festival, and overshot the 10:30 pm curfew time.

== Sports ==
Hyde Park contains several sporting facilities, including several football pitches and a Tennis centre. There are numerous cycle paths, and horse riding is popular. In 1998 British artist Marion Coutts recreated Hyde Park, along with Battersea and Regent's Park, as a set of asymmetrical ping-pong tables for her interactive installation Fresh Air. For the 2012 Summer Olympics, the park hosted the triathlon, which brothers Alistair Brownlee and Jonathan Brownlee took the Gold and Bronze medals for Team GB, and the 10 km open water swimming events. The park has also hosted the ITU World Triathlon Grand Final.

From 2013, the Royal Parks started a scheme to charge individuals for playing team sports on the old football pitches.

== Transport ==
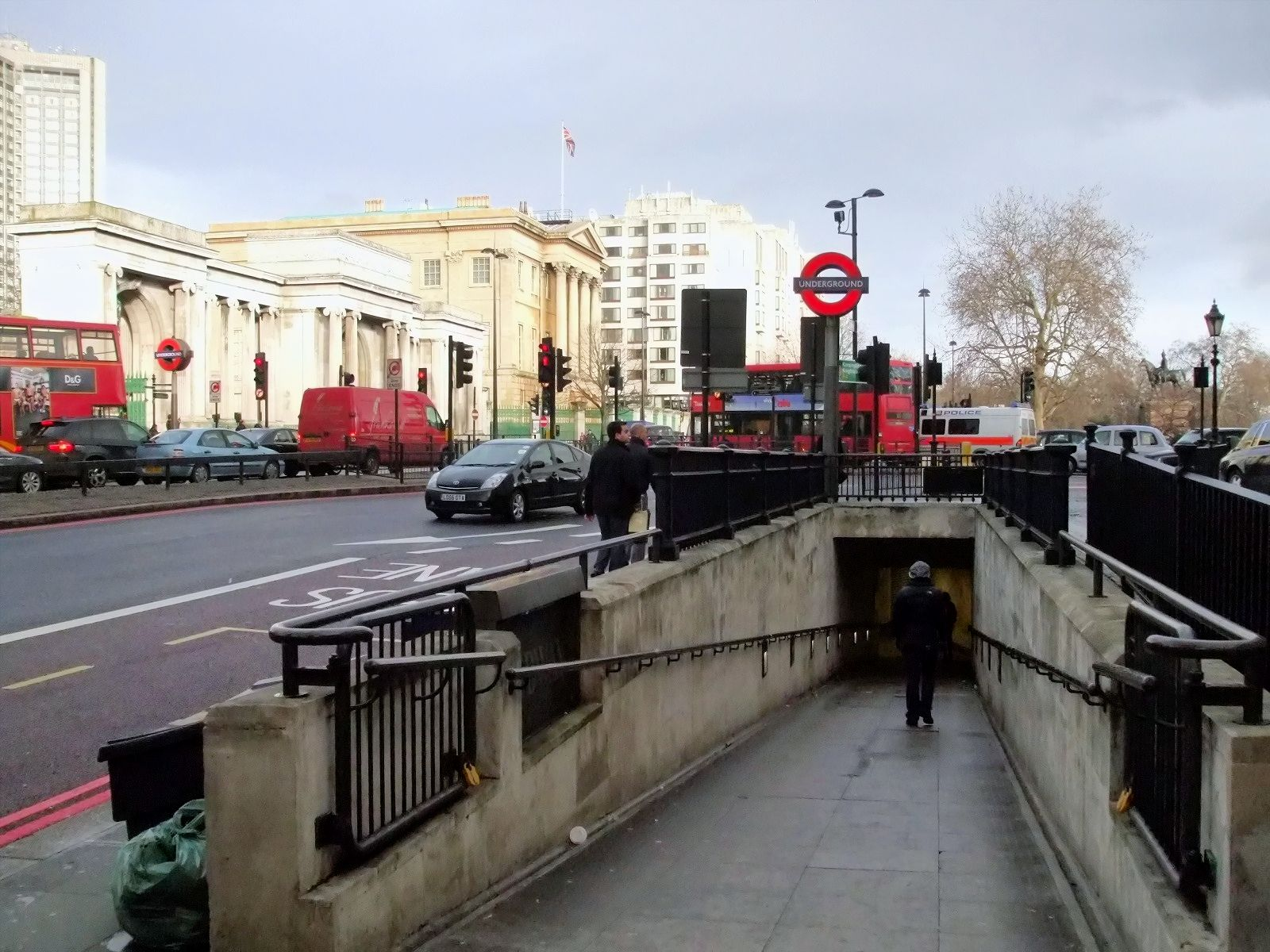
Entrance to Hyde Park Corner tube station, with the Grand Entrance to the left

There are five London Underground stations located on or near the edges of Hyde Park and Kensington Gardens (which is contiguous with Hyde Park). In clockwise order starting from the south-east, they are:

- Hyde Park Corner (Piccadilly line)
- Knightsbridge (Piccadilly line)
- Queensway (Central line)
- Lancaster Gate (Central line)
- Marble Arch (Central line)

Bayswater tube station, on the Circle and District lines, is also close to Queensway station and the north-west corner of the park. High Street Kensington tube station, on the Circle and District is very close to Kensington Palace located on the Southwest corner of Kensington Gardens. Paddington station, served by Bakerloo, Circle and District, and Hammersmith & City lines, is close to Lancaster Gate station and a short walk away from Hyde Park.

Several main roads run around the perimeter of Hyde Park. Park Lane is part of the London Inner Ring Road and the London congestion charge zone boundary. Transport within the park for people lacking mobility and disabled visitors is provided free of charge by Liberty Drives, located at Triangle Carpark. Cycle Superhighway 3 (CS3) begins at Lancaster Gate, on the northern perimeter of Hyde Park. It is one of several TfL-coordinated cycle routes to cross the Park. CS3 also crosses Hyde Park Corner on its route towards Westminster and the City of London. The route opened in September 2018 and is signposted and cyclists are segregated from other road traffic on wide cycle tracks.

== See also ==
- Hyde Park, Belgrade
- Hyde Park, Boston
- Hyde Park, Chicago
- Hyde Park, Sydney

== Sources ==
- Bradley, Simon; Pevsner, Nikolaus (2003). London: Westminster. The Buildings of England. New Haven, US, London, UK: Yale University Press. ISBN 9780300095951. OCLC 609428632.
- Cheetham, David; Winkler, Ulrich, eds. (2011). Interreligious Hermeneutics in Pluralistic Europe: Between Texts and People Volume 40 of Currents of Encounter. Rodopi. ISBN 978-9-401-20037-0. ISSN 0923-6201.
- German, Lindsey; Rees, John (2012). A People's History of London. Verso Books. ISBN 978-1-844-67914-0.
- Humphreys, Rob; Bamber, Judith (2003). London. Rough Guides. ISBN 978-1-843-53093-0.
- Porter, Roy (2000). London: A Social History. Penguin UK. ISBN 978-0-140-10593-3.
- Rabbitts, Paul (2015). Hyde Park: The People's Park. Amberley Publishing Limited. ISBN 978-1-445-64301-4.
- Self, Andrew (2014). The Birds of London. A&C Black. ISBN 978-1-408-19404-1.
- Weinreb, Ben; Hibbert, Christopher; Keay, John; Keay, Julia, eds. (2008) [1983]. The London Encyclopaedia (Third ed.). Macmillan. ISBN 978-1-405-04924-5.
