= List of public art in the London Borough of Camden =

This is a list of public art in the London Borough of Camden.

== Bloomsbury ==
Image	Title / subject	Location and coordinates	Date	Artist / designer	Architect / other	Type	Designation	Notes
	Statue of George I	Atop the spire of St George's Church 51.51762°N 0.12498°W	1730		Nicholas Hawksmoor	Architectural sculpture	Grade I	
More images	Statue probably of Charlotte of Mecklenburg-Strelitz	Queen Square 51.52207°N 0.12274°W	c. 1775	?	—N/a	Statue	Grade II	
More images	Statue of Francis Russell, 5th Duke of Bedford	Russell Square 51.52118°N 0.12543°W	1809	Richard Westmacott	—N/a	Statue	Grade II	
More images	Statue of Charles James Fox	Bloomsbury Square 51.51929°N 0.12327°W	1816	Richard Westmacott	—N/a	Statue	Grade II*	
More images	Statue of John Cartwright	Cartwright Gardens 51.52685°N 0.12670°W	1831	George Clarke	—N/a	Statue	Grade II	
More images	The Progress of Civilisation	British Museum	1851	Richard Westmacott	Robert Smirke	Pedimental sculpture	Grade I	
More images	Drinking fountain with a figure of the Woman of Samaria	Guilford Place opposite Coram's Fields 51.52348°N 0.11945°W	1870	?	Henry Darbishire	Drinking fountain with sculpture	Grade II	
More images	Euterpe	St George's Gardens 51°31′34″N 0°7′14.3″W	1898	?	—N/a	Statue (formerly architectural sculpture)	Grade II	Terracotta statue from the demolished Apollo Inn on Tottenham Court Road by Charles Fitzroy Doll.
More images	Lions	King Edward VII Galleries, British Museum, Montague Place	1909	George Frampton	John James Burnet and Thomas S. Tait		Grade I	
	Statue of Joseph Priestley	30 Russell Square (formerly the Institute of Chemistry)	1914	Gilbert Bayes	John James Burnet	Architectural sculpture	Grade II	
	War memorial	Church of the Holy Cross, Cromer Street	1919–1922	Clement William Jewitt	Joseph Peacock	Architectural sculpture	Grade II	
	War memorial	Church of the Holy Cross, Cromer Street	?	?	Joseph Peacock	Architectural sculpture	Grade II	
More images	The Rangers', 12th London Regiment War Memorial	Chenies Street	1923	—N/a	Leonard Culliford	Cenotaph	Grade II	Unveiled 10 November 1923.
More images	Memorial to Louisa Aldrich-Blake	Tavistock Square 51°31′29″N 0°7′40.9″W	1926	Arthur George Walker	Edwin Lutyens	Memorial with busts	Grade II	
	Agriculture	Victoria House, Bloomsbury Square elevation	1926–1932	Herbert William Palliser	Charles William Long	Pedimental sculpture	Grade II	
	Industry	Victoria House, Southampton Row elevation	1926–1932	Herbert William Palliser	Charles William Long	Pedimental sculpture	Grade II	
More images	Bust of Hippocrates	University College London Building, Gower Place/Gower Street 51°31′30.41″N 0°8′8.09″W	1930	William Aumonier Jr.		Architectural sculpture	—N/a	
More images	Tragedy and Comedy	RADA, 62 Gower Street	1930–1931	Alan Durst		Relief	—N/a	
More images	Memorial to Richard Trevithick	Gower Street	1933	Leonard Stanford Merrifield	—N/a	Relief plaque	—N/a	
	Bust of Frederick Craufurd Goodenough	London House (Goodenough College), Mecklenburgh Square	1936	William McMillan	Herbert Baker	Architectural sculpture	Grade II	
	Bust of Thomas Coram	Foundling Museum, Brunswick Square	c. 1937	William McMillan	J. M. Shepherd	Architectural sculpture	Grade II	
More images	The Spirit of Brotherhood	Congress House, Great Russell Street 51.51750°N 0.12858°W	1958	Bernard Meadows	David Aberdeen	Architectural sculpture	Grade II*	
More images	Statue of Thomas Coram	Outside the Foundling Museum, Brunswick Square 51.52513°N 0.12149°W	1963	William McMillan	—N/a	Statue	Grade II	
More images	Statue of Mahatma Gandhi	Tavistock Square 51.52504°N 0.12904°W	1968	Fredda Brilliant	—N/a	Statue	Grade II	
	Beneath the Skin	Outside Bupa House, Bloomsbury Way	1991	Peter Randall-Page	—N/a	Sculpture	—N/a	
More images	Humphrey the cat	Alf Barrett Playground 51.5205°N 0.1215°W	1992	Marcia Solway	—N/a	Sculpture	—N/a	Originally placed in Queen Square in 1997; moved to present location in 2003.
More images	Conscientious Objectors Commemorative Stone	Tavistock Square	1994	Hugh Court	—N/a	Commemorative stone	—N/a	
	Mosaic path	Calthorpe Community Garden 51.5270°N 0.1178°W	1994	Carol Cooper and local people	—N/a	Mosaic path	—N/a	
More images	Statue of Thiruvalluvar	Outside School of Oriental and African Studies	1996		—N/a	Statue	—N/a	
More images	The Green Man	Woburn Square 51°31′23.1″N 0°7′45.5″W	1999	Lydia Kapinska	—N/a	Sculpture	—N/a	Inspired by Virginia Woolf's novel The Waves (1931).
	Peter Pan	Great Ormond Street Hospital	2000	Diarmuid Byron O'Connor	—N/a	Sculpture	—N/a	
More images	Memorial to Andrew Meller	Queen Square 51°31′18.2″N 0°7′20.7″W	2001	Patricia Finch	—N/a	Sculpture	—N/a	
More images	Bust of Virginia Woolf	Tavistock Square 51°31′27.9″N 0°7′44″W	2004 (cast of an original of 1931)	Stephen Tomlin	—N/a	Bust	—N/a	
	Tinker Bell	Great Ormond Street Hospital	2005	Diarmuid Byron O'Connor	—N/a	Sculpture	—N/a	
	Lions and unicorns fighting for the crown	On the spire of St George's Church 51.51762°N 0.12498°W	2006	Tim Crawley	Nicholas Hawksmoor	Architectural sculpture	Grade I	
	Tokens	Marchmont Street 51.5246°N 0.1249°W	2006	John Aldus	—N/a	Sculpture	—N/a	Replicas of tokens used to identify children at the nearby Foundling Hospital, embedded in the pavement.
	Sundial	Torrington Square 51°31′18.8″N 0°7′46.5″W	2008		—N/a	Armillary sphere	—N/a	
	Sam Patricia Penn	Queen Square 51°31′16″N 0°7′19.4″W	2009 (after an original of 1997)	?	—N/a	Sculpture	—N/a	Patricia Penn (1914–1992) was a nurse who campaigned against the demolition of historic buildings in the 1970s. The original sculpture donated to the square in her memory was stolen in 2007.
	Baby Things, Mitten	Outside the Foundling Museum 51.5251°N 0.1214°W	2010	Tracey Emin	—N/a	Sculpture	—N/a	Originally part of a series of sculptures for the 2008 Folkestone Triennial. This cast was donated to the Foundling Museum in 2010.
More images	Bust of Rabindranath Tagore	Gordon Square	2011	Shenda Amery	—N/a	Bust	—N/a	
More images	Bust of Noor Inayat Khan	Gordon Square	2012	Karen Newman	—N/a	Bust	—N/a	
More images	Bust of Leonard Wolfson, Baron Wolfson	Queen Square 51.522121°N 0.122524°W	2017	Nick Roberson	—N/a	Bust	—N/a	
More images	7 July Memorial 7 July 2005 bombing on Tavistock Square	Tavistock Square Gardens 51.525506°N 0.129010°W	2018	Carmody Groarke	—N/a	Memorial plaque	—N/a	
	HWJ Creative mural	Barbon Close 51.5215°N 0.1200°W	2018	HWJ Creative	—N/a	Mural	—N/a	
	Double Portrait	Barbon Close 51.5214°N 0.1203°W	2020	"CeePil"	—N/a	Mural	—N/a	
	Self Care	Barbon Close 51.5215°N 0.1203°W	2020	?	—N/a	Mural	—N/a	
	Breastfeeding woman	Barbon Close 51.5215°N 0.1203°W	2020	Hanna Lucatelli	—N/a	Mural	—N/a	
	The Wink	Barbon Close 51.5215°N 0.1204°W	2020	Otto Schade	—N/a	Mural	—N/a	
	Complexities of Love	Barbon Close 51.5215°N 0.1204°W	2020	David Puck	—N/a	Mural	—N/a	
	Male face	Barbon Close 51.5215°N 0.1204°W	2020	Envol Studio	—N/a	Mural	—N/a	
	Diaspora	Tybalds Estate 51.5217°N 0.1120°W	2020	Sara Abdalla	—N/a	Mural	—N/a	
	Flamingoes	Tybalds Estate 51.5211°N 0.1201°W	2020	Frankie Strand and Angry Dan	—N/a	Mural	—N/a	
	Reborn	Alf Barrett Playground 51.5205°N 0.1213°W	2020	Fat Heat	—N/a	Mural	—N/a	

== Camden Town ==
Image	Title / subject	Location and coordinates	Date	Artist / designer	Architect / other	Type	Designation	Notes
More images	Statue of Richard Cobden	Camden High Street 51.53474°N 0.13891°W	1868	Wills Brothers	—N/a	Statue	Grade II	
	Memorial to Charles Dibdin	St Martin's Gardens 51.5386°N 0.1399°W	1889	?	—N/a	Celtic cross	Grade II	
	War memorial	St Michael's Church 51.5400°N 0.1416°W	1920	Clement William Jewitt (with C. J. Marston)	—N/a	Calvary	Grade II	
	Generations	Maitland Park Villas 51°32′51.5″N 0°9′22″W	1963	Geoffrey Harris	—N/a	Sculptural group	—N/a	Commissioned by the London County Council for the development of the Maitland Park Estate. Fibreglass painted to resemble bronze. Harris had worked as an assistant to Henry Moore, and Generations resembles Moore's Family Group. Restored in 2026.
More images	Seated figure	Westminster Kingsway College on Longford Street 51.526041°N 0.141376°W	1976	Jean Bullock	—N/a	Sculpture	—N/a	
More images	Cat statues	Entrance to former Carreras Cigarette Factory, Hampstead Road 51.5334°N 0.1395°W	1996				—N/a	
	Black cat motifs	Façade of former Carreras Cigarette Factory, Hampstead Road 51.5335°N 0.1398°W	1996				—N/a	
More images	Burma Railway Memorial Far East Prisoners of War	Junction of Crowndale Road, Eversholt Street and Mornington Street 51.5350°N 0.1388°W	2012		Chris Roche (1104 Architects)	War memorial	—N/a	Unveiled 21 September 2012 by the Viscount Slim, whose father Field Marshal Slim was a commander of the Burma Corps. A granite plaque with an illustration by Ronald Searle, who had been an FEPOW, mounted on a cruciform base of railway sleepers and sections of rail track, alluding to the Burma Railway.
More images	Statue of Amy Winehouse	Stables Market 51.5424°N 0.1478°W	2014	Scott Eaton	—N/a	Statue	—N/a	Unveiled 14 September 2014, which would have been the singer's 31st birthday, by the actress Barbara Windsor, a friend of hers.
	Horses	Stables Market 51.54196°N 0.14729°W				Sculpture	—N/a	

== Euston Road ==
Image	Title / subject	Location and coordinates	Date	Artist / designer	Architect / other	Type	Designation	Notes
More images	Caryatids	St Pancras New Church 51.52742°N 0.12990°W		John Charles Felix Rossi	William Inwood and Henry William Inwood	Architectural sculpture	Grade I	
	Britannia	St Pancras railway station, Pancras Road elevation 51.53025°N 0.12455°W			George Gilbert Scott	Architectural sculpture	Grade I	
More images	Statue of Robert Stephenson	Euston railway station 51.52786°N 0.13257°W	1871	Carlo Marochetti	—N/a	Statue	Grade II	Removed from outside Euston in 2020 due to the HS2 redevelopment. From 2025 on a 10-year loan to the Locomotion Museum in Shildon, County Durham.
	War memorial Great Northern Railway (WWI) London and North Eastern Railway (WWII)	King's Cross railway station	1920			Panels in steel frames		Unveiled 10 June 1923 by Earl Haig. Reinstalled in its current configuration in 2013, with the placement of the panels based on that of the figures in John Singer Sargent's painting Gassed (1919).
More images	London and North Western Railway War Memorial	Outside Euston railway station 51.5272°N 0.13258°W	1921	Ambrose Neale	Reginald Wynn Owen	War memorial	Grade II*	
	Euston Arch tile motif	Euston tube station, Victoria line platforms	1968	Tom Eckersley		Ceramic mural	—N/a	
	Five crowns on a cross tile motif	King's Cross St Pancras tube station, Victoria line platforms	1968	Tom Eckersley		Ceramic mural	—N/a	
More images	Piscator Erwin Piscator	Forecourt of Euston railway station	1980	Eduardo Paolozzi		Sculpture	—N/a	
More images	Newton Isaac Newton	Forecourt of the British Library 51.52904°N 0.12762°W	1995	Eduardo Paolozzi		Sculpture	Grade I	
More images	Saint Joan by George Bernard Shaw	Shaw Theatre (entrance on Ossulston Street) 51°31′43.9″N 0°7′40.8″W	2002 (after an original of 1971)	Keith Grant		Sculpture	—N/a	
	Archangel Michael Victims of the 7 July 2005 bombings	St Pancras New Church 51°31′36.9″N 0°7′48.4″W	2004	Emily Young	—N/a	Sculpture	—N/a	
More images	Monolith and Shadow	Main entrance of University College Hospital on Euston Road	2005	John Aiken		Sculpture	—N/a	
More images	The Meeting Place	St Pancras railway station	2007	Paul Day	—N/a	Sculpture	—N/a	
More images	Statue of John Betjeman	St Pancras railway station	2007	Martin Jennings	—N/a	Statue	—N/a	
	Unity	Unison headquarters	2011	Wendy Taylor		Sculpture	—N/a	
More images	Statue of Matthew Flinders	Euston railway station	2014	Mark Richards	—N/a	Statue	—N/a	
More images	Statue of Nigel Gresley	King's Cross railway station	2016	Hazel Reeves	—N/a	Statue	—N/a	
More images	Full Circle	King's Cross St Pancras tube station, Northern line and Piccadilly line concourses	2009–2011	Knut Henrik Henriksen		Installation	—N/a	A segment of a circle, corresponding to the "lost" area below the floor, is set against the partly circular end wall of each of the tunnels.
	War memorial Workers at St Pancras station	St Pancras railway station	2018	Fabian Peake		Memorial wall with vitreous enamel plaques		Inscribed with the job titles of workers at the station during both world wars. There had been plans for a war memorial at the station since 1921, but they were unrealised for lack of funds.

=== Regent's Place ===
Image	Title / subject	Location and coordinates	Date	Artist / designer	Architect / other	Type	Designation	Notes
More images	The Battle of Cape St Vincent	Regent's Place Plaza	c. 1826	Edward Hodges Baily		Relief	—N/a	One of two monumental reliefs intended for what became Marble Arch.
More images	Reflection	350 Euston Road	2001	Antony Gormley		Sculpture	—N/a	
	The Fan, or Big Fan	Triton Square	2003	Michael Craig-Martin		Lightbox installation	—N/a	The artist's first major outdoor commission.
	Reciprocal Passage Work	Triton Square Mall	2003	Liam Gillick		Installation	—N/a	
	A Couple of Ripe, Ornamental Pineapples	Longford Street	2010	Siôn Parkinson		Installation	—N/a	
	Regent's Place Pavilion	Triton Street	2010	—N/a	Kevin Carmody and Andrew Groarke	Pavilion	—N/a	
	Ruth Walking in Jeans	4 Triton Square	2012	Julian Opie		Installation	—N/a	
	Opening/Capture	Regent's Place Plaza		Langlands & Bell		Sculptural seating	—N/a	The artists' first public commission in the United Kingdom.

== Fitzrovia ==
Image	Title / subject	Location and coordinates	Date	Artist / designer	Architect / other	Type	Designation	Notes
	"Warren" tile motif	Warren Street tube station, Victoria line platforms	1968	Alan Fletcher		Ceramic mural	—N/a	
More images	View	Fitzroy Square 51°31′22.6″N 0°8′22.7″W	1977	Naomi Blake	—N/a	Sculpture	—N/a	
	Fitzrovia Mural	Whitfield Gardens 51.520765°N 0.135089°W	1980	Simon Barber and Mick Jones	—N/a	Mural	—N/a	The mural depicts "various unnamed characters of Fitzrovia and greedy speculators". Barber painted the bottom half and Jones (son of the trade unionist Jack Jones) the top half. Restored 2020 by Global Street Art.
More images	Statue of Francisco de Miranda	Corner of Fitzroy Square and Fitzroy Street	1990 (after an original of 1895)	After Rafael de la Cova	—N/a	Statue	—N/a	Stands close to 58 Grafton Way ("Casa Miranda"), where the Venezuelan revolutionary lived with his English wife from 1802 to 1810.
More images	The One and The Many	Fitzroy Place	2015	Peter Randall-Page	—N/a	Sculpture	—N/a	

== Gospel Oak ==
Image	Title / subject	Location and coordinates	Date	Artist / designer	Architect / other	Type	Designation	Notes
More images	War memorial	Church of All Hallows 51.5556°N 0.1574°W	1918	?	—N/a	Calvary	Grade II	

== Hampstead ==
Image	Title / subject	Location and coordinates	Date	Artist / designer	Architect / other	Type	Designation	Notes
	Virgin and Child	St Mary's Church, on façade of tower 51.556967°N 0.18045°W	c. 1850		William Wardell	Statue in niche	Grade II*	
	Roebuck	Tympanum of the Roebuck pub, Pond Street 51.5538°N 0.1674°W	Late 1860s	?	?	Architectural sculpture	Grade II	
More images	Drinking fountain	Rosslyn Hill 51.554977°N 0.17362°W	c. 1875	?	?	Drinking fountain	Grade II	
More images	Drinking fountain William Warburton Pearce	South End Green 51.5542°N 0.1654°W	1880	J. H. Evins (designer)	J. Holland (builder)	Drinking fountain	Grade II	
More images	Chalybeate well Susanna Noel	Well Walk 51.559177°N 0.17345°W	1882	H. S. Legg			Grade II	
More images	War memorial	St John-at-Hampstead 51.5553°N 0.1803°W	c. 1920	—N/a	Temple Moore	Memorial cross and balustrade	Grade II	
	Woman	Outside 28A High Street 51.55591°N 0.17672°W				Architectural sculpture	—N/a	
	War memorial	Christ Church 51.5596°N 0.1771°W		?	—N/a	Celtic cross	Grade II	
	Doo Wah Diddy	Royal Free Hospital		Helen Sinclair	—N/a	Sculpture	—N/a	

=== Hampstead Heath ===
Image	Title / subject	Location and coordinates	Date	Artist / designer	Architect / other	Type	Designation	Notes
More images	Hampstead War Memorial	Junction of Spaniards Road and North End Way 51.562792°N 0.179597°W	1922	—N/a	Reginald Blomfield	Obelisk	Grade II	
	Evenings' Hill	Platforms of Hampstead Heath railway station	2011	Clare Woods	—N/a	Ceramic mural	—N/a	

== Highgate ==
Highgate is partly located outside the borough of Camden; for works not listed here see the relevant sections for the boroughs of Haringey and Islington.

Image	Title / subject	Location and coordinates	Date	Artist / designer	Architect / other	Type	Designation	Notes
	Drinking fountain	Highgate Hill	1874	?	—N/a	Drinking fountain	—N/a	
More images	Statue of Sir Sydney Waterlow, 1st Baronet	Waterlow Park 51.56919°N 0.14503°W	1900	Frank Taubman	—N/a	Statue	Grade II	
	Drinking fountain	Waterlow Park	1901	?	—N/a	Drinking fountain	—N/a	
More images	War memorial	United Reformed Church 51.5701°N 0.1492°W	c. 1920	Herbert Ibberson	—N/a	Memorial cross	Grade II	
	War memorial	St Anne's Church 51.5625°N 0.1515°W	c. 1920	?	—N/a	Memorial cross	Grade II	
More images	Tomb of Karl Marx	Highgate Cemetery 51.56623°N 0.14379°W	1956	Laurence Bradshaw	—N/a	Bust	Grade I	

== Holborn ==
Image	Title / subject	Location and coordinates	Date	Artist / designer	Architect / other	Type	Designation	Notes
More images	Drinking fountain	Lincoln's Inn Fields 51.5165°N 0.1182°W	1861	—N/a	?	Drinking fountain	Grade II	
More images	Philip Twells Memorial Drinking Fountain Philip Twells	Lincoln's Inn Fields 51.5160°N 0.1150°W	1882	—N/a	Robert Keirle	Drinking fountain	Grade II	
More images	Statue of Thomas More	Thomas More Chambers, 51 and 52 Carey Street	1886	Robert Smith	George Sherrin	Statue in niche	Grade II	
More images	Statue of John Bunyan	Baptist Church House, Southampton Row	1903	Richard Garbe	Arthur Keen	Statue in niche	Grade II*	
	Statue of Edward I	114 and 115 High Holborn	1903	Richard Garbe	Arthur Keen	Architectural sculpture	Grade II	
	Statue of Edward VII	114 and 115 High Holborn	1903	Richard Garbe	Arthur Keen	Architectural sculpture	Grade II	
	Madonna and Child Lucile Tomkinson (d. 1905)	Church of St Alban the Martyr	c. 1905	?		Ceramic relief		
	Bust of Charles Dickens	Holborn Bars, High Holborn	1907	Percy Hetherington Fitzgerald	Alfred Waterhouse	Bust		
More images	Statue of Francis Bacon	South Square, Gray's Inn	1912	F. W. Pomeroy	—N/a	Statue	Grade II	
More images	Memorial to Margaret Ethel MacDonald	Lincoln's Inn Fields	1914	Richard Reginald Goulden		Memorial seat with sculpture	Grade II	
More images	Lincoln's Inn War Memorial	New Square, Lincoln's Inn	1921			War memorial	Grade II	Unveiled 16 March 1921.
	Britannia with Arab Traders, a Big Game Hunter and His Bearer, and Animals	Africa House, 70 Kingsway	1922	Benjamin Clemens	Trehearne and Norman	Architectural sculpture	Grade II	
More images	Prudential Assurance Company War Memorial (World War I)	Waterhouse Square	1922	Ferdinand Victor Blundstone		War memorial	Grade II*	Unveiled 2 March 1922.
	Memorial to Frederick Smith, 2nd Viscount Hambleden	Lincoln's Inn Fields	1929	Arthur George Walker (lost bust)	Edwin Lutyens	Pedestal in the form of a seat	Grade II	
More images	Prudential Assurance Company War Memorial (World War II)	Waterhouse Square	1950	Ferdinand Victor Blundstone		War memorial	Grade II*	Unveiled 23 March 1950.
	Pearl Assurance Company Heraldic Relief	High Holborn	1967–1969	Edward Bainbridge Copnall		Relief		
More images	Bust of John Hunter	Lincoln's Inn Fields	1979	Nigel Boonham	—N/a	Bust	—N/a	
More images	Bust of Bertrand Russell	Red Lion Square	1980	Marcelle Quinton	—N/a	Bust	—N/a	
More images	Camdonian	Lincoln's Inn Fields	1980	Barry Flanagan	—N/a	Sculpture	—N/a	
More images	Statue of Fenner Brockway	Red Lion Square	1985	Ian Walters	—N/a	Statue	—N/a	
More images	Jesus Being Raised from the Dead	Church of St Alban the Martyr	1985	Hans Feibusch		Sculpture		
	Trompe-l'œil panels depicting artefacts in the British Museum	Holborn tube station	1988	Allan Drummond		Enamel panels	—N/a	Based on Victorian glass plate negatives which the artist borrowed from the museum.
	Dolphin	Between High Holborn and Lincoln's Inn Fields	1989	Anna Richtner Pentney		Architectural sculpture	—N/a	
	Royal Canadian Air Force Memorial	Lincoln's Inn Fields	1998			War memorial	—N/a	Unveiled 14 May 1998.
More images	Square the Block	London School of Economics New Academic Building, corner of Kingsway and Sardinia Street 51°30′54″N 0°7′6.8″W	2009	Richard Wilson		Architectural sculpture	—N/a	

== Kentish Town ==
Image	Title / subject	Location and coordinates	Date	Artist / designer	Type	Designation	Notes
	War memorial	Church of St Silas the Martyr	After 1918	?	Calvary		
	Fletcher Court artwork	Ingestre Road Estate 51.5561°N 0.1424°W	2019	Laurie Nouchka	Mural, 3D maps, audio	—N/a	
	Botanical murals	Ingestre Road Estate 51.5565°N 0.1429°W	September 2020	Clara and Mary	Mural	—N/a	

== King's Cross ==
Image	Title / subject	Location and coordinates	Date	Artist / designer	Architect / other	Type	Designation	Notes
	The Well Keeper, Mary Wollaston	Calthorpe Community Garden, Gray's Inn Road	2025	Marcia Bennett-Male	—N/a	Statue	—N/a	Funded by the Mayor of London's Commission for Diversity in the Public Realm.

== Primrose Hill ==
Image	Title / subject	Location and coordinates	Date	Artist / designer	Architect / other	Type	Designation	Notes
More images	Memorial to Iolo Morganwg	Primrose Hill	2013	John Meirion Morris	Ieuan Rees	Relief plaque	—N/a	Commemorates the first meeting of the Welsh Gorsedd of Bards, organised by Iolo and held on Primrose Hill on the summer solstice of 1792.

== Regent's Park ==
Part of Regent's Park lies outside the borough of Camden; for works not listed here see the list of public art in St Marylebone.

Regent's Park is one of London's Royal Parks, located partly in the London Borough of Camden and partly in the City of Westminster.

Image	Title / subject	Location and coordinates	Date	Artist / designer	Architect / other	Type	Designation	Notes
More images	Readymoney Drinking Fountain	Broad Walk 51.5328°N 0.1507°W	1869	Henry Ross	Robert Keirle	Drinking fountain	Grade II	A gift from the Indian industrialist Cowasji Jehangir Readymoney, unveiled by Princess Mary of Teck. The fountain straddles the boundary line between Camden and Westminster.
More images	The Three Graces	Cambridge Gate	1875–1880	Joseph Kremer	T. Archer and A. Green	Sculptural groups	Grade II	Four sculptural groups in terracotta atop the gate piers to the north and south of the street.
More images	Matilda Fountain Matilda Kent	Gloucester Gate 51.53552°N 0.14741°W	1878	Joseph Durham	—N/a	Fountain with sculpture	Grade II	
	War memorial	St Mary Magdalene's Church, Munster Square (facing Osnaburgh Street)	After 1918			Architectural sculpture	Grade II*	
More images	Replica of Jelling stone	St Katharine's, The Danish Church in London 51.5336°N 0.1467°W	1955			Runestone	—N/a	Replica of the original runestone from Jutland, Denmark, dated to c. 988 CE
	The Martyrdom of Saint Pancras	Gloucester Gate Bridge	c. 2003–2006	Stuart Bamford Smith after Ceccardo Egidio Fucigna	William Booth Scott	Reliefs	Grade II	Two identical bronze reliefs, the composition based on one of Fucigna's originals of 1878. Fucigna's other relief, not replicated, showed Pope Marcellinus blessing the saint.

== Somers Town ==
Image	Title / subject	Location and coordinates	Date	Artist / designer	Architect / other	Type	Designation	Notes
	Saint Pancras	Theatro Technis, 26 Crowndale Road	1896	Harry Hems	Charles Robert Baker King	Statue in niche	—N/a	
	War memorial	St Mary's Church, Eversholt Street		?		Memorial cross	Grade II	

== Swiss Cottage ==
Image	Title / subject	Location and coordinates	Date	Artist / designer	Architect / other	Type	Designation	Notes
More images	The Pursuit of Ideas	Hilgrove Estate, Finchley Road	1960	Leon Underwood	—N/a	Sculpture	—N/a	
More images	The Hampstead Figure	Adelaide Road	1964	F. E. McWilliam	—N/a	Abstract sculpture	Grade II	Moved to this site in 2019 from its original location on Avenue Road, north of Swiss Cottage Library.
More images	Statue of Sigmund Freud	Belsize Lane/Fitzjohns Avenue 51.54620°N 0.17560°W	1970 (current location since 1998)	Oscar Nemon	—N/a	Statue	Grade II	

== West Hampstead ==
Image	Title / subject	Location and coordinates	Date	Artist / designer	Type	Designation	Notes
	Memorial to Beryl Gilroy	West Hampstead Primary School 51.5509°N 0.1993°W	2022	Fipsi Seilern	Mural painting	—N/a	Unveiled 1 July 2022.

== Bibliography ==
- Asprey, Ronald; Bullus, Claire (2009). The Statues of London. London and New York: Merrell.
- Gleichen, Lord Edward (1973). London's Open-air Statuary. Bath: Cedric Chivers Ltd.
- Matthews, Peter (2018). London's Statues and Monuments. Oxford: Shire Publications.
