= Columbia Market =

Former Victorian market in east London

Coordinates: 51.5287°N 0.0733°W

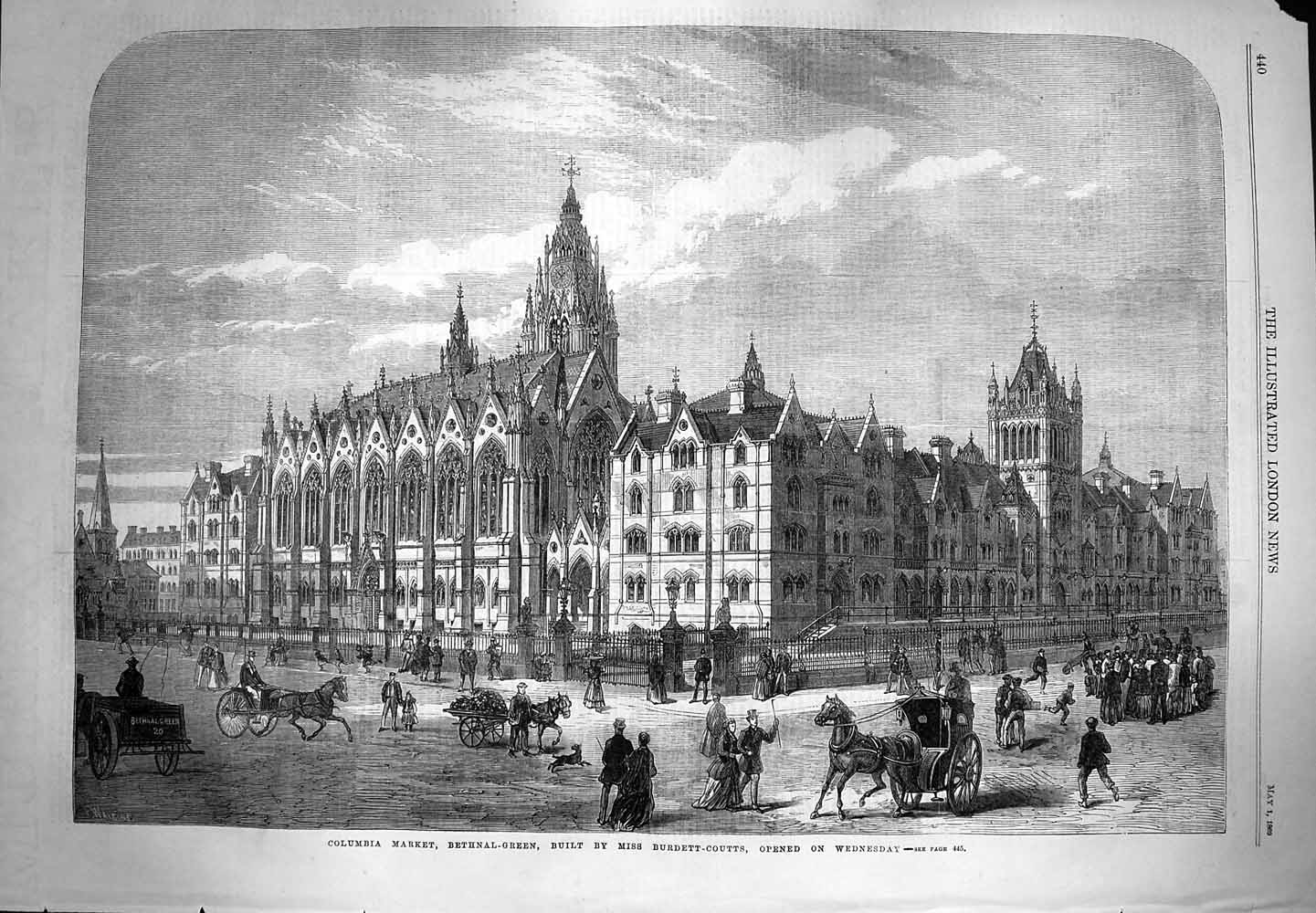
Columbia Market in the Illustrated London News, 1869

Columbia Market was a market hall and philanthropic venture funded by Baroness Angela Burdett-Coutts that was located on Columbia Road in Bethnal Green, London, England. The market and square were so named to reference Burdett Coutts' involvement in the establishment of the Diocese of British Columbia. The market's construction was completed and opened in 1869, but after little initial success was closed in 1889 with the building being demolished around 1960. The only surviving remnants are a set of exterior gates and railings.

The market accompanied, at the recommendation of Charles Dickens, a number of dwellings which would make up the adjacent Columbia Square development. The site occupied by Columbia Market now houses Sivill House and the Dorset Estate, with a street in the latter being named "Old Market Square". The extant and successive Columbia Road Flower Market operates nearby.

== Description ==
The market was designed by Henry Darbishire and made use of the Gothic style which was popular at the time. The market aimed to provide both a place for costermongers to sell produce without threat of penalty for selling on the street and a place within the poorer neighbourhoods of the East End where such produce could reliably be found. The design played into the prevalent Puginian ideas at the time associating Gothic architecture with good morality. A correspondent of the London Society magazine would write to say that for the poorer residents of the area, it would be "impossible for the coarsest and most ignorant minds to be in constant familiarity with graceful forms without profit of elevation and refinement".

Its layout was a rectangular plot of land approximately 87 by 78 metres with buildings lining the outer rim. A central gatehouse fronted onto Columbia Road at the southern end, serving as the main entrance. On the opposite side of the courtyard sat the main market hall with a central tower, beyond was a deliveries yard. The architecture was inspired by French Gothic Cathedral design.

Columbia Square to the immediate east of Columbia Market included four blocks surrounding a central courtyard which held a decorated clock tower with an Eleanor Cross like design. The dwellings themselves also had significant Gothic ornamentation with pointed arches and window tracery present.

== History ==
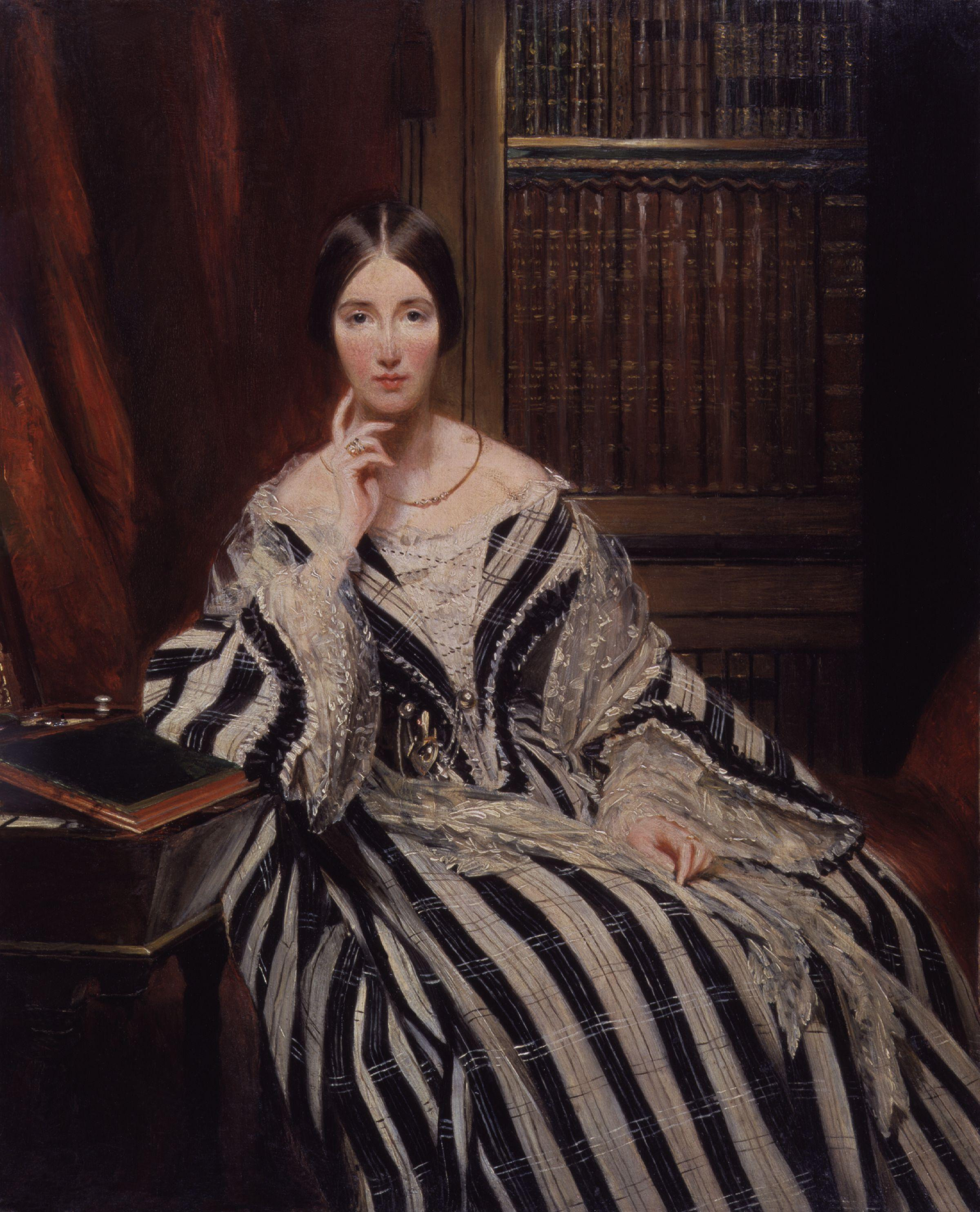
Portrait of Angela Burdett-Coutts who spearheaded the project

The construction of dwellings in Columbia Square was carried out between 1859 and 1862. Subsequently work on Columbia Market commenced in 1864, and the market itself was established by act of parliament in 1866. Its official opening in 1869 saw extensive fanfare, with Burdett-Coutts herself present and the Archbishop of Canterbury speaking at the event.

Despite such excitement, the market faced limited success which was apparent as early as 1872. One observer, William Blanchard Jerrold, attributed this to a rejection of liberal principles by the local sellers and population at large, although this interpretation neglected the fact that sellers who attempted to use the market would find the circumstances unfavourable with a lack of interest among buyers and competition from other markets.

It would equally poorly serve the local community as a London County Council report found that dealers "would frequently buy up the whole stock of the best fish immediately on its arrival and take it down to Billingsgate itself for landing and selling purposes". Although it was generally deemed to be somewhat of a failure, elements of its design may have served as models for future markets.

With the market generally being seen as a failure it was closed in 1886 and by the 1950s, the buildings that made up Columbia Market as well as Columbia Square sat in a state of dilapidation and were subsequently demolished.
