= Adrian Berg =

English artist (1929–2011)

- Born: 12 March 1929; London, England
- Died: 22 October 2011 (aged 82)
- Education: Gonville and Caius College, Cambridge; Trinity College Dublin
- Known for: Landscape painting

Adrian Berg RA (12 March 1929 – 22 October 2011) was an English painter known for his landscapes, many of them images of Regent's Park, London. Although some of his works appear almost naturalistic, typically they defy conventional notions of perspective and coloration. Instead they combine multiple viewpoints and time periods in a single image. His paintings are included in the permanent collections of the British Council, the British Museum, the European Parliament, the Royal Academy of Arts, the Tate, and the Victoria and Albert Museum, among others.

== Early life and education ==
Berg was born in London, the son of Charles Berg, a prominent Freudian psychiatrist and author, and Sarah Berg, and raised in Primrose Hill until he was sent to preparatory school and then to the private Charterhouse School in Surrey. In 1949 he went to Gonville and Caius College, Cambridge, to study medicine but later switched to English. He subsequently earned a degree in education from Trinity College Dublin and taught at schools in North London for two years, including Highgate Junior School under Kyffin Williams from January 1955, before deciding to study art at a variety of institutions, ending with the Royal College of Art. While in art school he became friends with a fellow student, David Hockney; the two remained close until the end of Berg's life.

== Career ==
In 1961, the year he completed his studies at the Royal College of Art, Berg moved into a flat at Gloucester Gate, a residential terrace designed by the celebrated architect John Nash overlooking Regent's Park. The park and its changing seasons would be his primary subject for the next 27 years, a period in which he reimagined the long British tradition of landscape painting. According to the critic Charles Darwent, "Berg, a psychiatrist's son, appraises nature with a cool doctor's eye, noting its symptoms, observing its changes. . . . What at first glance looks like a whimsical work, a paean to petals, is actually something very much steelier." The critic and poet Andrew Lambirth noted a similar tension. "His paintings are full-blooded emotional statements, in which the emotion is at least as tightly-controlled as the paint," Lambirth wrote, adding that Berg liked to quote Vita Sackville-West on the subject of her garden at Sissinghurst: "Profusion, even extravagance and exuberance, within the confines of utmost linear severity."

Unconventional as it is, Berg's work has been described as "among the finest British landscape painting of all time." It was shown frequently in London galleries—first at the venerable Arthur Tooth & Sons, then at the Waddington Galleries in Mayfair, and eventually at the Piccadilly Gallery. In 1986 Berg was given a retrospective at the Serpentine Galleries in London that subsequently traveled to Liverpool and Newcastle. Two years later he left London with his partner and assistant, Mike Osmund, for the seaside city of Brighton. There he became known as an eccentric old man, his spine bent double by arthritis, but he continued to paint, focusing now on such landscapes as the Sussex coast and the gardens of Stourhead in Wiltshire. He was elected to the Royal Academy of Arts in 1992 and named an honorary fellow of the Royal College of Art in 1994. In 1993 the Barbican Centre in London mounted an exhibition of his work, "Adrian Berg: A Sense of Place," that subsequently travelled to Bath, Sheffield, Edinburgh, and other cities in Britain.

Berg died in 2011 at the age of 82. A memorial was held at the Royal Academy at which David Hockney delivered the eulogy.
