= Victor Wilkins =

British architect

Victor Wilkins (1878–1972) was a British architect, and the in-house architect for the Peabody Trust from 1910 to 1947.

Victor Wilkins was born in 1878.

He succeeded Henry Darbishire as chief architect for the Peabody Trust, a role he held from 1910 to 1947.
