= Guilford Place public conveniences =

Coordinates: 51.523425°N 0.119427°W

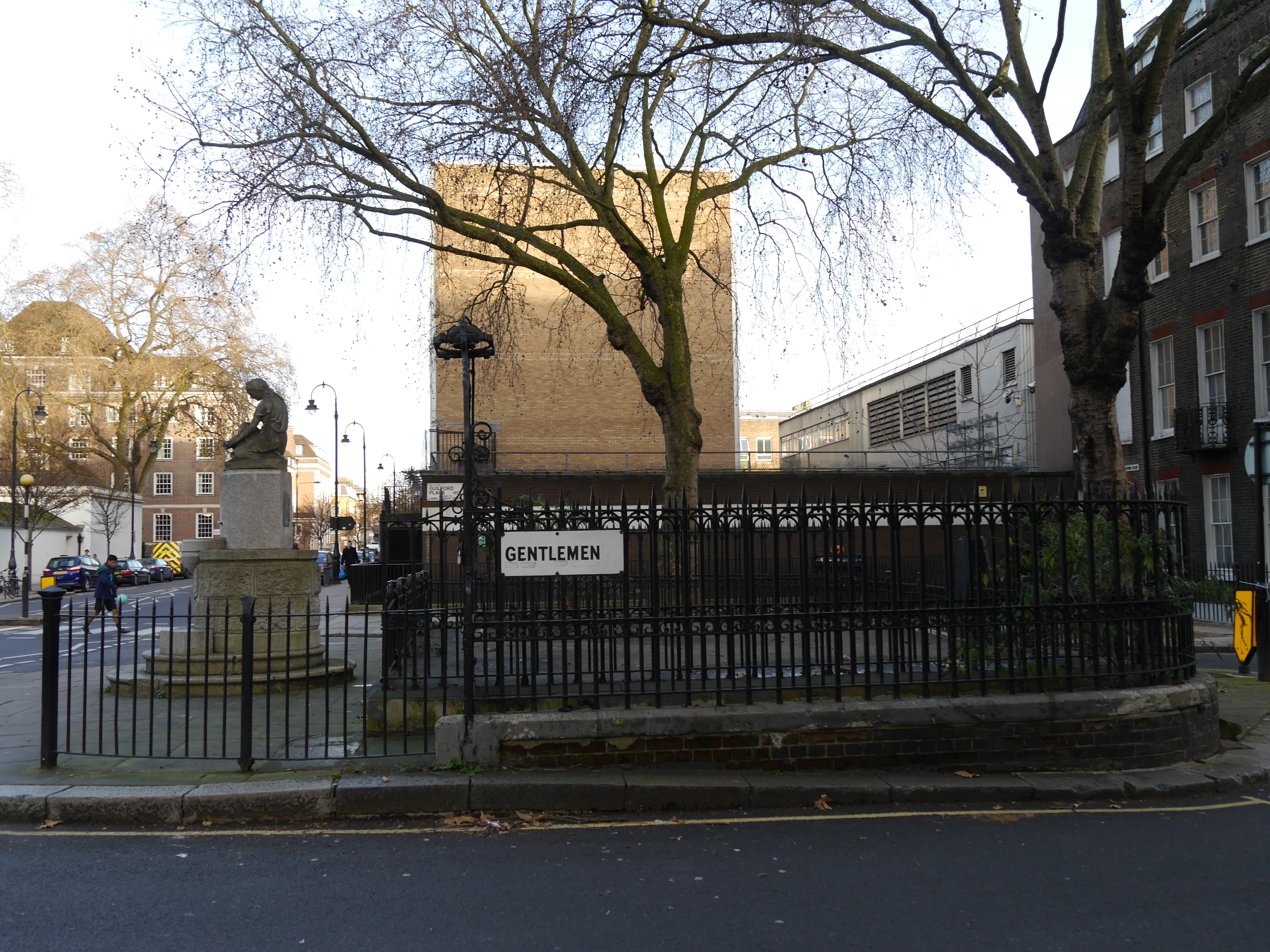
Guilford Place public conveniences, 2014

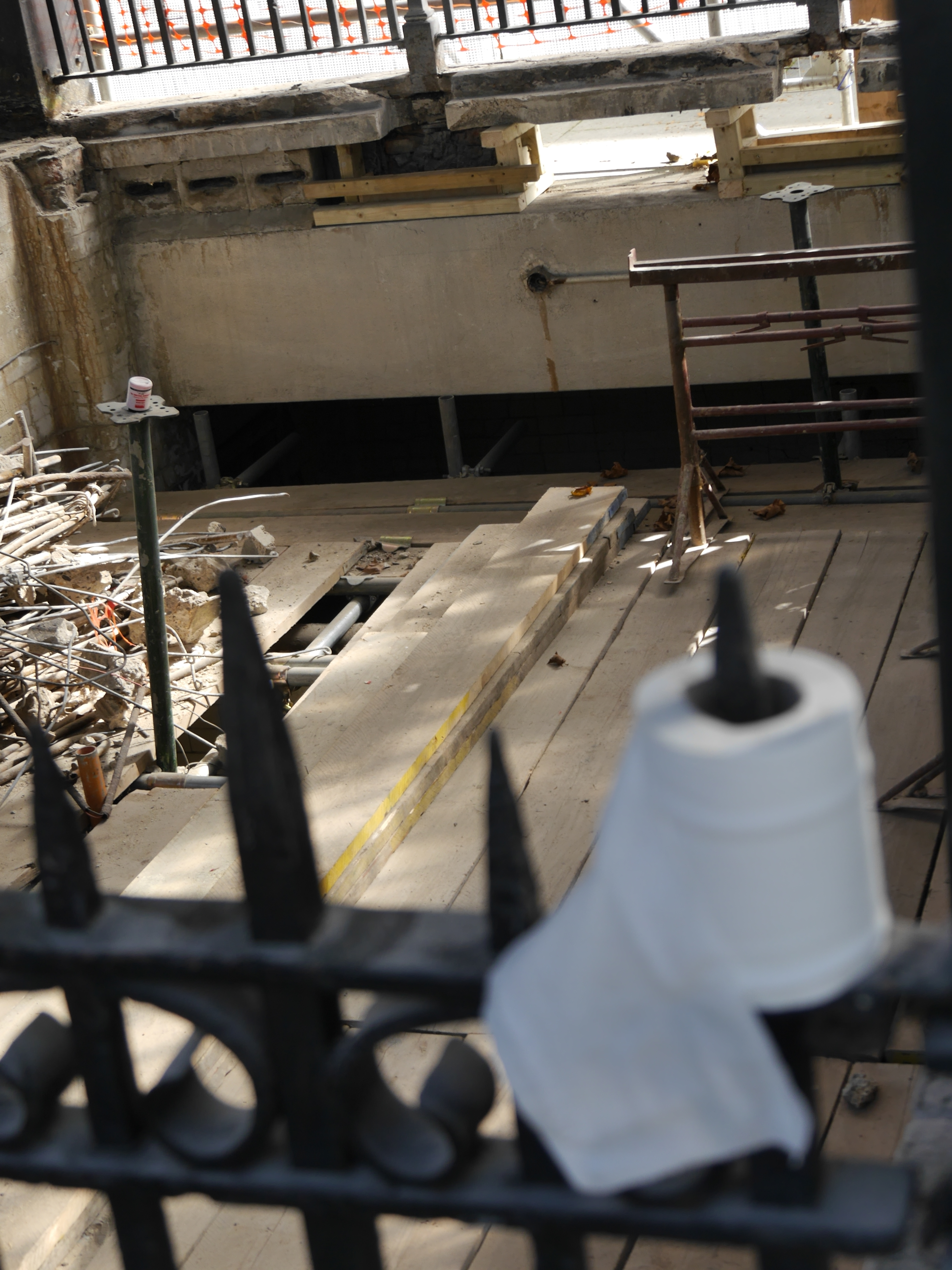
Guilford Place public conveniences, 2016

The Guilford Place public conveniences are Grade II listed former public toilets at Guilford Place, central London, built in the late 19th century.

The toilets have "yellow tiles, mahogany doors, decorative grills and their original fittings."

These underground toilets, then the busiest in the borough, were closed by Camden Council in the 1988, and as of February 2016, are due to be converted into a Tonkotsu Ramen noodle restaurant.
