= Inns of Court War Memorial =

War memorial in Hertfordshire, England

Coordinates: 51°46′23″N 0°32′41″W

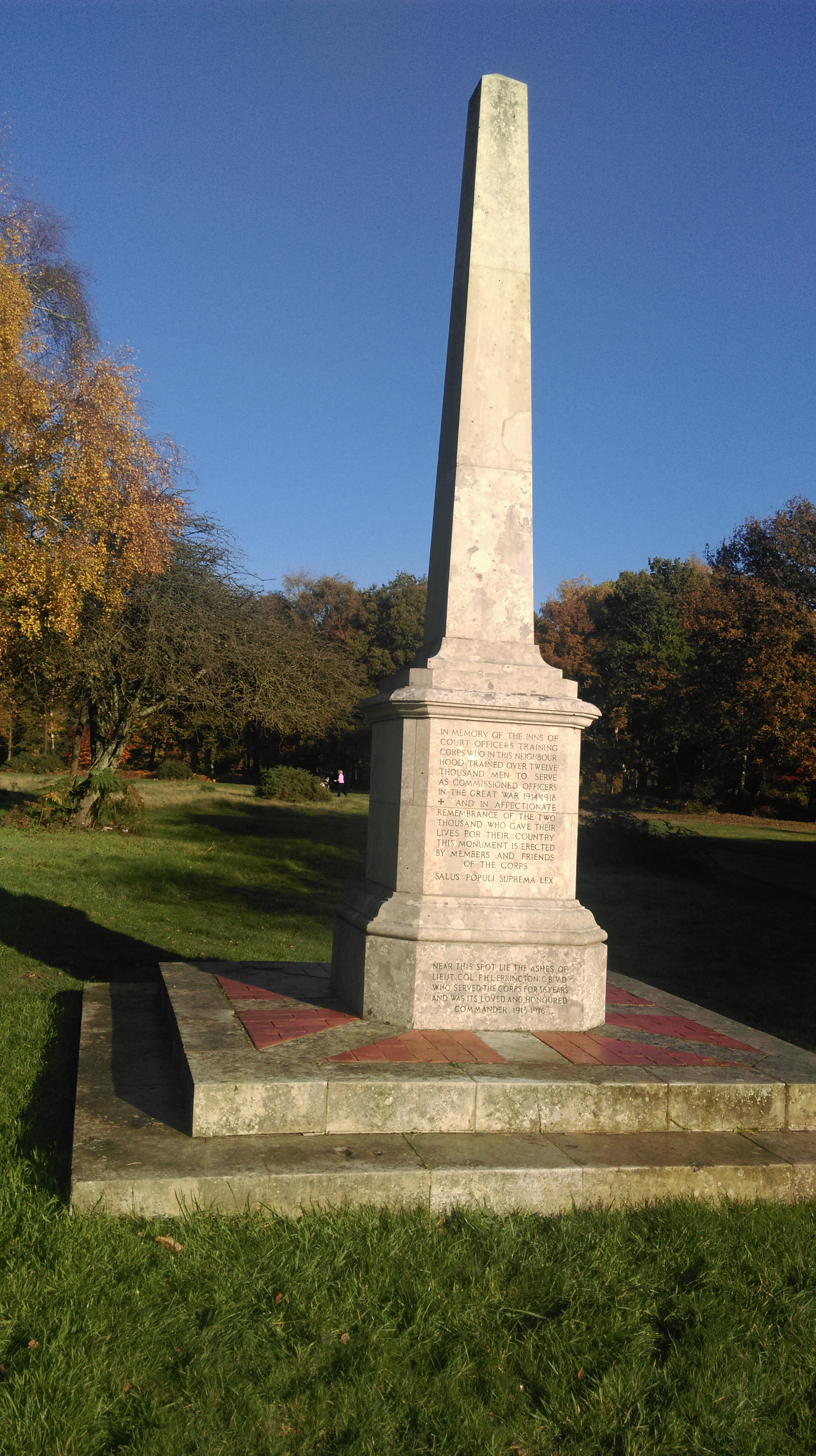

The Inns of Court Officers Training Corps Memorial is a First World War memorial near Berkhamsted, in the west of Hertfordshire. It is now on land that forms part of Berkhamsted Golf Course. The stone obelisk was erected c.1920, close to the temporary training camp of the corps on Berkhamsted Common which operated from 1914 to 1919. It became a Grade II listed building in November 2016.

== Background ==
The Inns of Court Officers Training Corps (OTC) was a Territorial Army unit based in Chancery Lane in London, near the headquarters of the Law Society of England and Wales and adjacent to Lincoln's Inn. The corps was closely associated with the legal profession, and its cap badge combined the arms of the four Inns of Court.

The Inns of Court OTC expanded rapidly in August and September 1914, as thousands volunteered for military service following the outbreak of the First World War, and the corps quickly outgrew its peacetime premises in London. A training camp opened in tents on Berkhamsted Common, in the west of Hertfordshire in September 1914 and remained in operation until June 1919, hosting around 2,000 officer cadets. As part of their training, the men dug around 13 miles (21 km) of trenches across Berkhamsted Common, evidence of which remains visible 100 years later.

Around 11,000 were commissioned and became officers in other units. Three were awarded the Victoria Cross, all posthumously: Jack Harrison of the East Yorkshire Regiment in 1917, Walter Napleton Stone of the Royal Fusiliers in 1918 and Christopher Bushell of the Royal West Surrey Regiment in 1918.

== Memorial ==
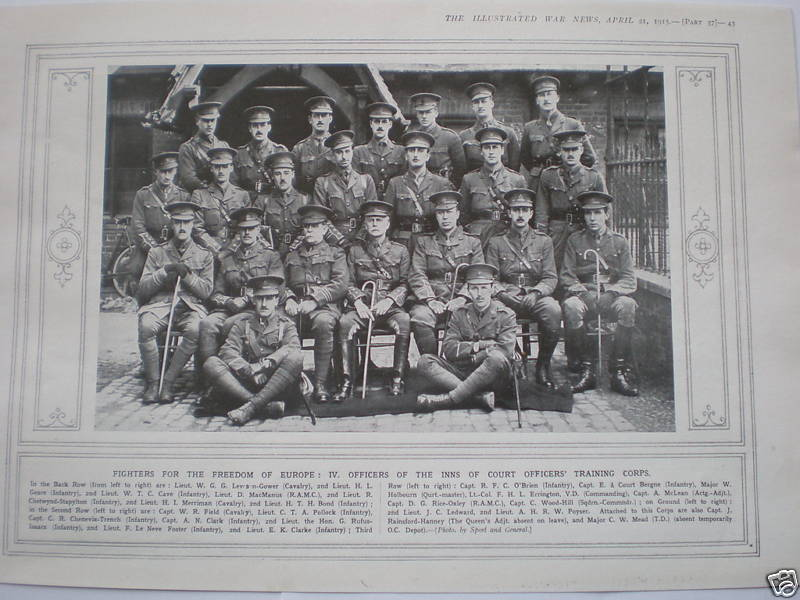
Officers of the Inns of Court OTC pictured in 1915

The memorial was erected c. 1920, comprising a stone obelisk standing on a square stone pedestal and base with two steps. The upper surface of the top step around the pedestal is inlaid with red bricks in eight triangular elements divided by white stone bands, forming a pattern which resembles Saint George's Cross overlaid with Saint Patrick's Saltire.

The pedestal bears the inscription:

IN MEMORY OF THE INNS OF / COURT OFFICERS TRAINING / CORPS. WHO IN THIS NEIGHBOUR / HOOD TRAINED OVER TWELVE / THOUSAND MEN TO SERVE / AS COMMISSIONED OFFICERS / IN THE GREAT WAR 1914–1918 / AND IN AFFECTIONATE / REMEMBRANCE OF THE TWO / THOUSAND WHO GAVE THEIR / LIVES FOR THEIR COUNTRY / THIS MONUMENT IS ERECTED / BY MEMBERS & FRIENDS OF / THE CORPS

This is followed by the Latin motto of the corps:

SALUS POPULI SUPREMA LEX (the safety of the people is the supreme law)

A later inscription on the base of the pedestal commemorates Lieutenant Colonel Francis Errington (1854–1942), who commanded the Inns of Court OTC from 1913 to 1916 and who published a history of the corps in 1922:

NEAR THIS SPOT LIE THE ASHES OF / LIEUT. COL. F.H.L. ERRINGTON C.B. V.D / WHO SERVED THE CORPS FOR 36 YEARS / AND WAS ITS LOVED & HONOURED / COMMANDER: 1913–1916

== See also ==
- Lincoln's Inn War Memorial, London
