= Matilda Fountain =

Statue and fountain by Joseph Durham

Coordinates: 51.535498°N 0.147422°W

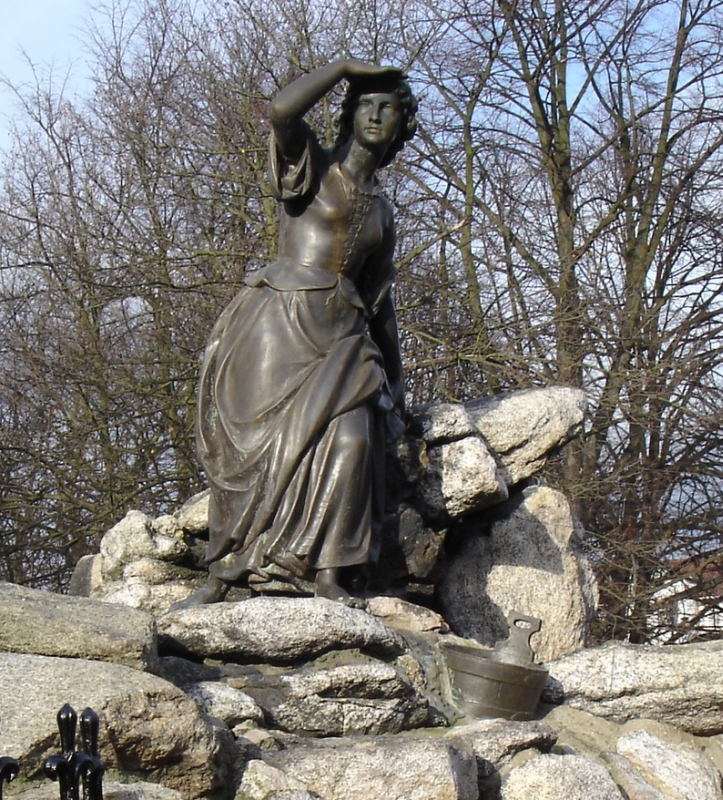
The Matilda Fountain and statue

The Matilda Fountain is a Grade II listed statue and drinking fountain opposite 15 Gloucester Gate, Regent's Park, London, built in about 1878.

The bronze statue is by Joseph Durham, and depicts a milkmaid holding a pail and looking towards the Park with a hand raised to shield her eyes. The entire monument was presented to the Metropolitan Drinking Fountain and Cattle Trough Association by Matilda, the wife of Richard Kent Jr, a local churchwarden.
