= Columbia Road Flower Market =

Street market in London

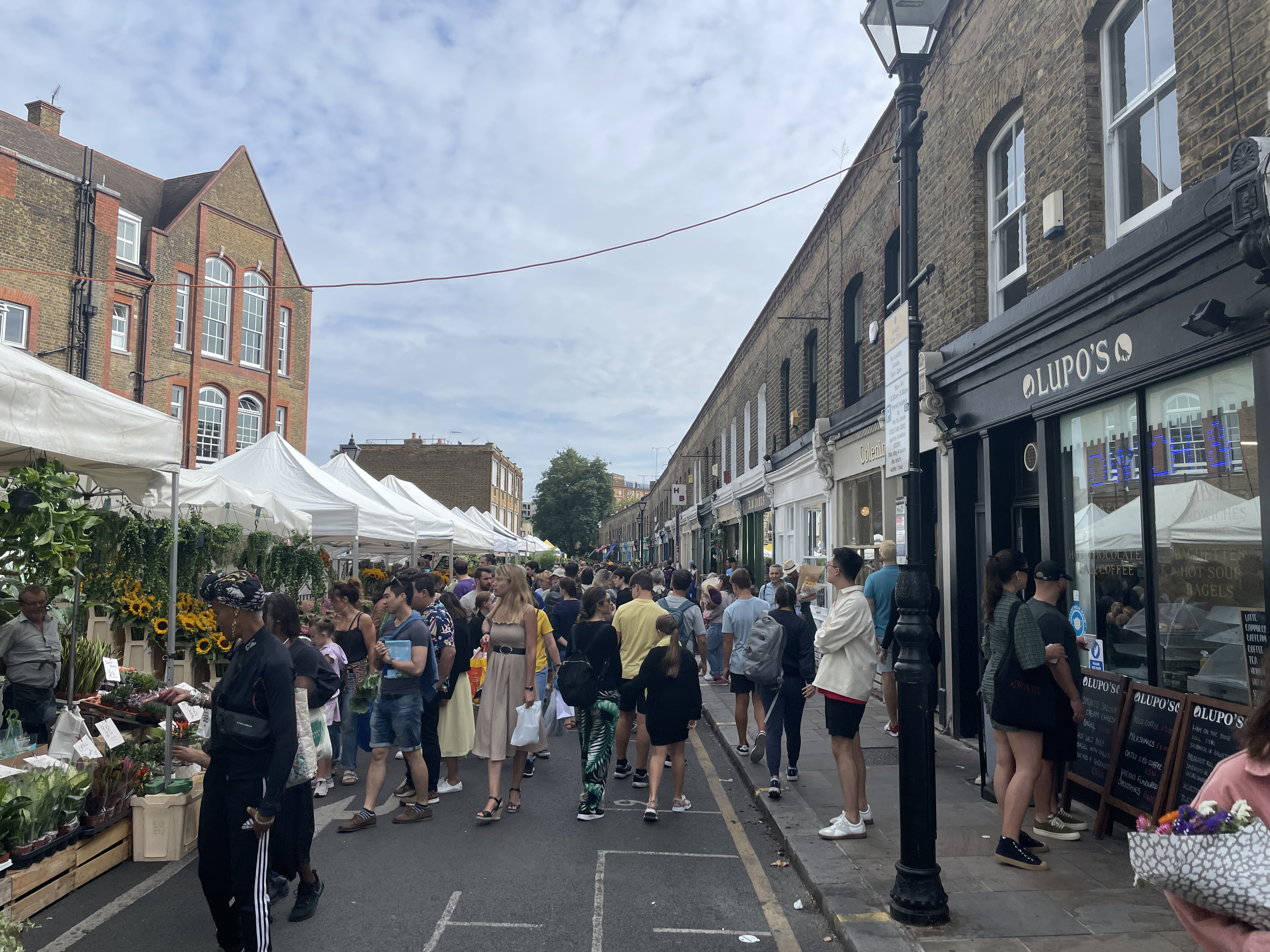
- Columbia Road Flower Market on the weekend
- Location: Columbia Road; Bethnal Green, Tower Hamlets, Greater London; 51.5294°N 0.0694°W
- Management: Tower Hamlets London Borough Council
- Owner: Tower Hamlets London Borough Council
- Environment: Outdoor
- Goods sold: Flowers and plants
- Days normally open: Sunday
- Number of tenants: 49
- Website: columbiaroadmarket.co.uk
- Interactive map of Columbia Road Flower Market

Columbia Road Flower Market is a street market in Bethnal Green in London, England. Columbia Road is a road of Victorian shops situated off Hackney Road in the London Borough of Tower Hamlets. The market is open on Sundays only.

== History ==
Columbia Market was built upon an area known as Nova Scotia Gardens. This had been a brick field, north-east of St Leonard's, Shoreditch; the brick clay had been exhausted and the area begun to be filled in with waste (leystall (excrement)). Cottages (probably evolving from sheds, serving the gardens), came to be built here, but were undesirable as they remained below ground level, and so were prone to flooding.

London Burkers

In July 1830, John Bishop and Thomas Williams rented no. 3 Nova Scotia Garden, from a Sarah Trueby. Together with Michael Shields, a Covent Garden porter, and James May, also known as Jack Stirabout and Black Eyed Jack, they formed a notorious gang of Resurrection men, stealing freshly buried bodies for sale to anatomists. On 7 November 1831 the suspiciously fresh corpse of a 14-year-old boy was delivered, by these men, to the King's College School of Anatomy, in the Strand. Joseph Sadler Thomas, a superintendent of police, searched the cottages at Nova Scotia Gardens, and found items of clothing in a well in one of the gardens, and also in one of the privies, suggesting multiple murders. The Resurrection men were arrested, and by an extraordinary arrangement, the police opened the premises for viewing, charging 5 shillings. The public carried away the dwelling, piece by piece, as souvenirs. Bishop and Williams were hanged at Newgate on 5 December 1831 for the murder. The police had tentatively identified the body as that of Carlo Ferrari, an Italian boy, from Piedmont, but at their trial Bishop and Williams admitted it to be that of a Lincolnshire cattle drover, on his way to Smithfield.

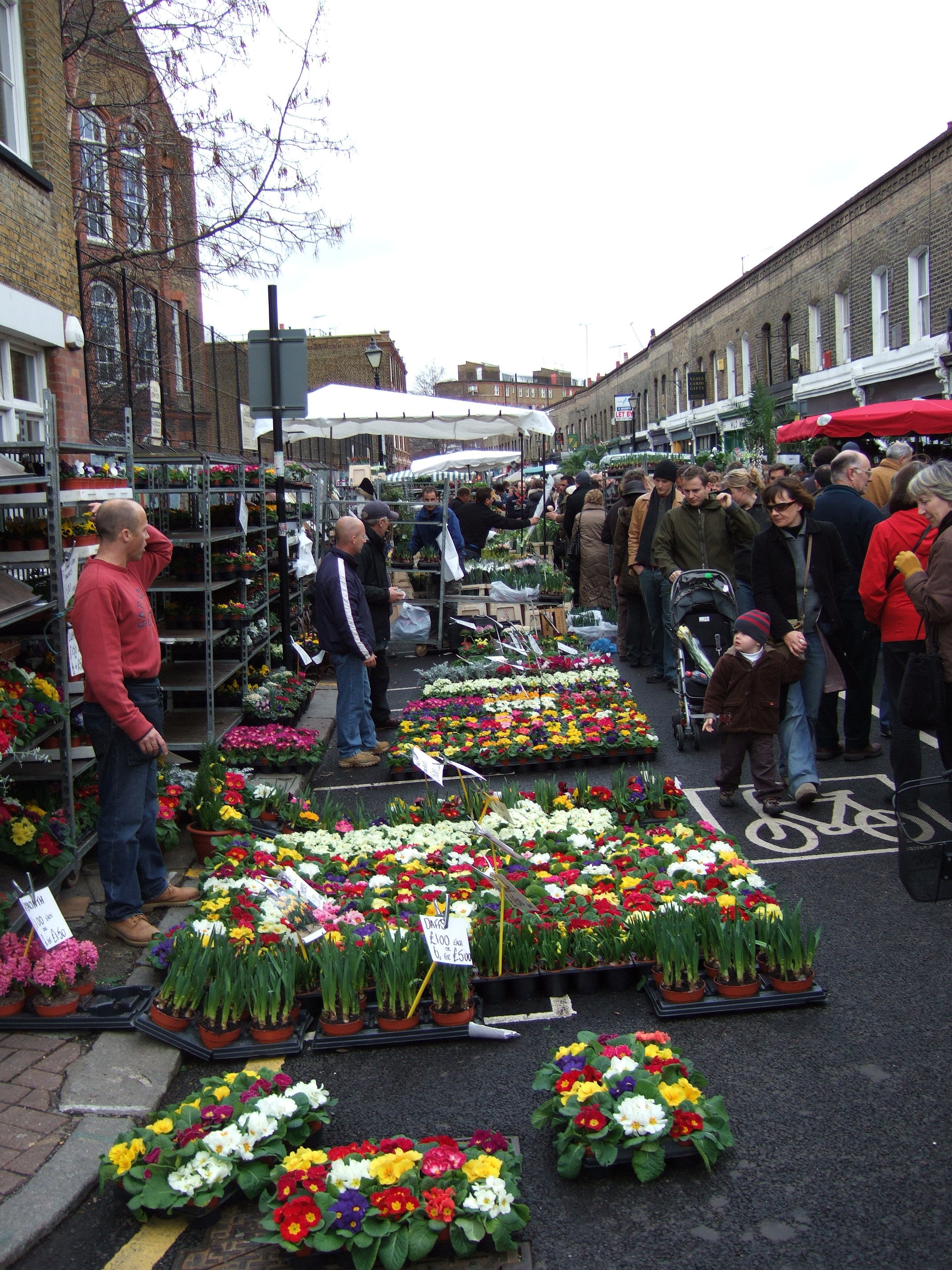
Flowers for sale at Columbia Road Flower Market

By 1840, the area had degenerated into a notorious slum. It is for this reason that the philanthropist Angela Burdett-Coutts purchased the land, and established Columbia Market.

Origins of Columbia Market

Angela Burdett-Coutts established Columbia Market in 1869 as a covered food market with 400 stalls. Her secretary and future husband William Burdett-Coutts came to own the market, and built up a considerable fishing fleet in the North Sea. He was involved in a planned railway line for the delivery of the fish to the market; but competition from Billingsgate Fish Market meant that it was never built, and traders preferred selling outdoors. The market closed in 1886, after use as warehouses and small workshops. Prompted by Charles Dickens, Angela Burdett-Coutts also built the separate U-shaped Columbia Dwellings, of several storeys, with a three-storey Gothic arch built into the brickwork of the central section. The building was demolished in 1958, although the remains of railings can be seen in front of the Nursery School. Sivill House and the Dorset Estate replaced the Coutts buildings.

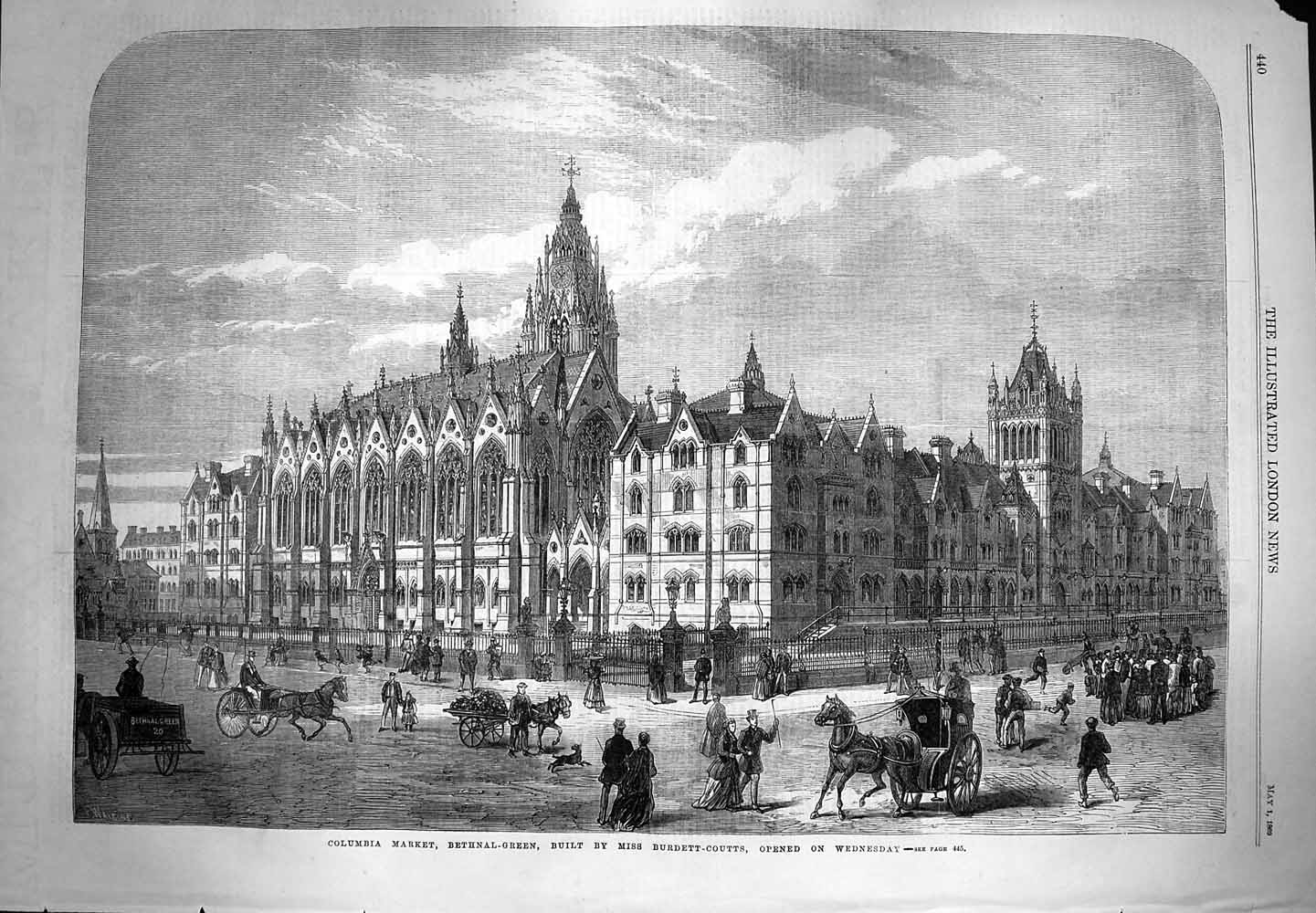
Columbia Market in the Illustrated London News, 1869

== Recent history ==
The Columbia Road flower market began as a Saturday trading market. It was moved to Sunday, by act of Parliament, in order to accommodate the needs of local Jewish traders. This also provided the opportunity for Covent Garden and Spitalfields traders to sell their stock left over from Saturday. The enduring interest and demand for cut flowers and plants were introduced to the East End by Huguenot immigrants (driven from France after 1685 by the revocation of the Edict of Nantes), together with a fascination for caged songbirds – the pub at the end of the market is called The Birdcage.

The market suffered in World War II from rules prioritising food production, and went into a long decline. A large civilian shelter beneath the market suffered a direct hit by a 50 kg bomb on the night of Saturday, 7 September 1940, at the height of The Blitz. From the 1960s, new rules forced traders to attend regularly, and the market enjoyed a new resurgence with the increasing popularity of gardening programmes.

Modern market

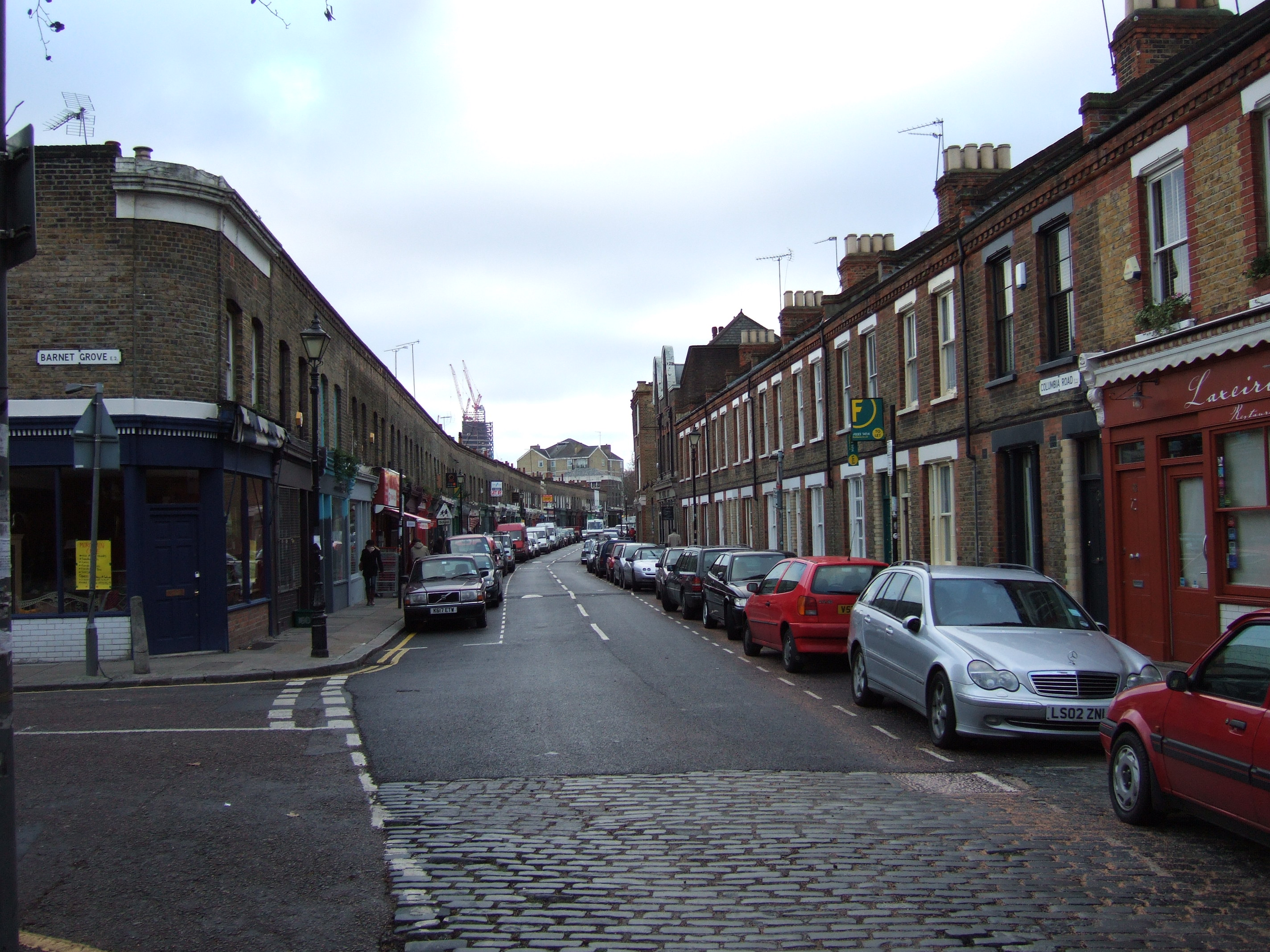
Columbia Road on a weekday morning. Looking west towards Shoreditch

The market is in operation every Sunday from 8 am to 2 pm. Traders arrive from 4 am to set up their stalls. A wide range of plants, bedding plants, shrubs, bulbs and freshly cut flowers is available at competitive prices. Many of the traders are the second or third generation of their family to sell at the market.

The market also has shops selling bread and cheeses, antiques, garden accessories, unusual international edibles, soap, candlesticks and Buddhist artefacts.

Much of Columbia Road is part of the Jesus Green Hospital Estate.

The market is popular not only with plant and flower buyers but also with photographers and television companies, who frequently film there.

== Transport ==
The nearest stations are Hoxton and Shoreditch High Street (London Overground). Bethnal Green (London Underground Central line) and Bethnal Green and Cambridge Heath mainline stations are also within walking distance. Bus routes 26 and 55 serve Hackney Road, and 8, 388 and D3 serve Bethnal Green Road.

== See also ==
- List of markets in London
- Market (place)
- Retail

== Bibliography ==
- Helen MacDonald - Legal Bodies: Dissecting Murderers at the Royal College of Surgeons, London 1800-1832 - in Traffic: An Interdisciplinary Postgraduate Journal, No.2, 2003 pp.9-32 ISSN 1447-2538
- Sarah Wise - The Italian Boy: A Tale of Murder and Body Snatching in 1830s London (Metropolitan Books, 2004) ISBN 0805075372
- Image of the 'Burker' cottages, at City of London library
