= Holly Village =

Victorian housing estate in Highgate, London

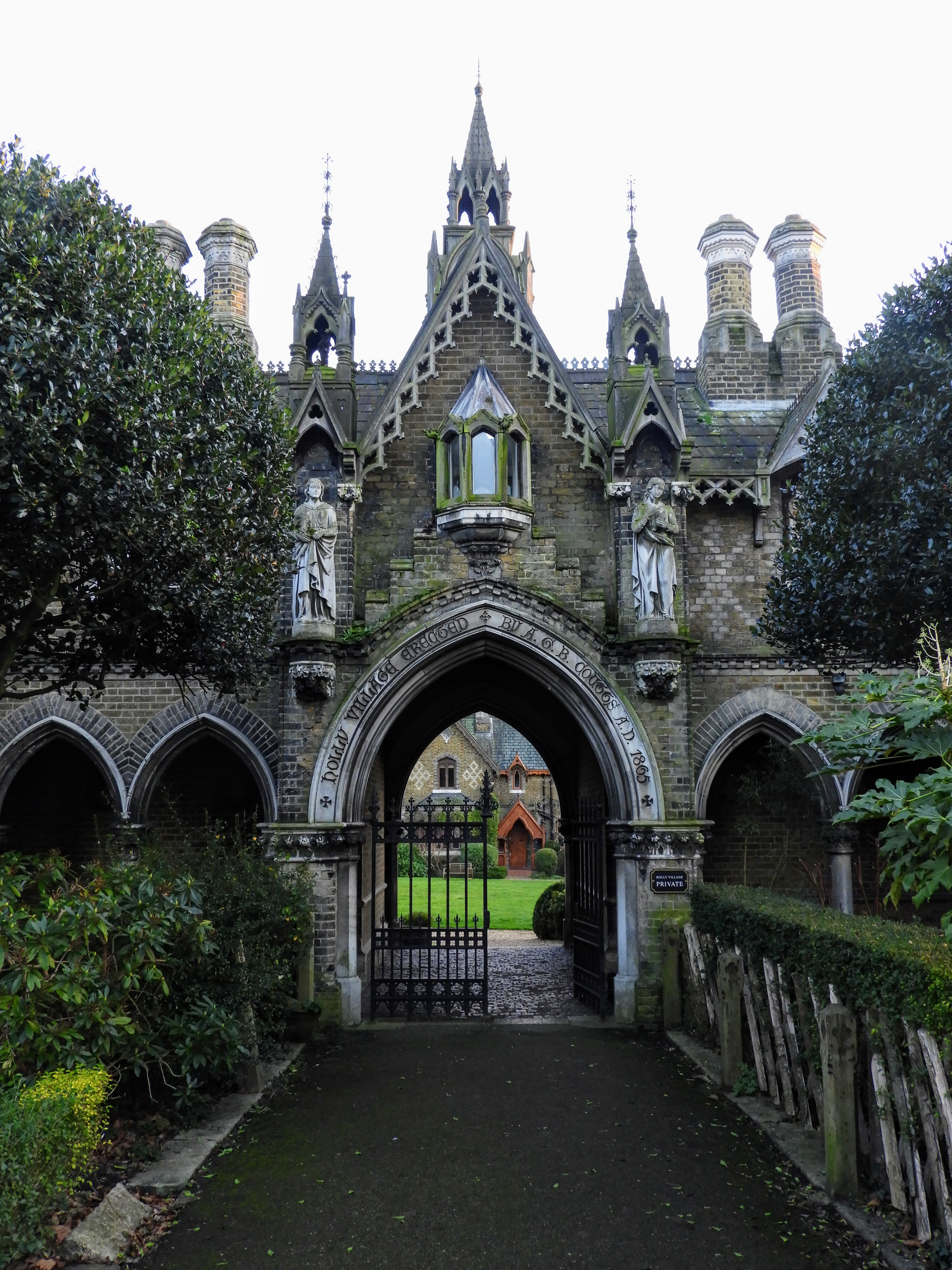
- Interactive map of the Holly Village area

General information
- Type: Residential
- Architectural style: Gothic Revival
- Location: Highgate, London Borough of Camden, England
- Coordinates: 51°33′46″N 0°08′47″W
- Completed: 1865

Design and construction
- Architect: Henry Darbishire

Listed Building – Grade II*
- Official name: 1-12 Holly Village
- Designated: 10 June 1954
- Reference no.: 1379116

Holly village is a Grade II* listed residential estate consisting of 12 cottages surrounding a central private garden in Highgate, London. The cottages are made from brickwork with masonry and woodwork decoration in Gothic style, being an example of a suburban cottage orné development. The Village is seen as a quintessential example of the philosophies of Victorian Gothic Architecture, and has also been appreciated for its enclosed feel, considered by some to be a "village within a village".

The Village lies at the southern end of what was then the Holly Lodge Estate. and currently stands adjacent to the modern housing estate of the same name. Across the road is also the walls of what was at the time of its construction a newly acquired eastern extension of Highgate Cemetery, which itself houses various Gothic tombs and monuments.

== History ==
The estate was designed by Henry Darbishire with civil engineer William Cubitt overseeing the construction of the project – it was completed in 1865. Devised and funded by Baroness Burdett-Coutts, a wealthy philanthropist, there have been suggestions that the houses were built for her servants although the estate has since been understood to consist of homes made for private rent.

In 1921, The Village was purchased by a number of its tenants.

== Description ==
At the northern entrance to Holly Village is a gabled archway with an inscription that reads reads "Holly Village erected by AGB Coutts AD 1865" in reference to its founder. The statues either side of the gateway are said to represent Burdett-Coutts herself as well as her friend Hannah Brown.

The houses possess many decorative features that are characteristic of Gothic architecture including pointed arches, lancet windows, spirelets and window tracery. The designs are noted as featuring many animals as ornamental details such as gargoyles and grotesques, likely influenced by Budett-Coutts' love for animals. Her statue holds a dog and that of Brown holds a dove.

== Status ==
The Holly Village estate is currently Grade II* listed by Historic England and is within the Dartmouth Park Conservation Area, having previously been part of the Highgate Conservation Area since 1978.
