= 3–6 Guilford Place =

Row of buildings in London, England

Coordinates: 51.523321°N 0.119129°W

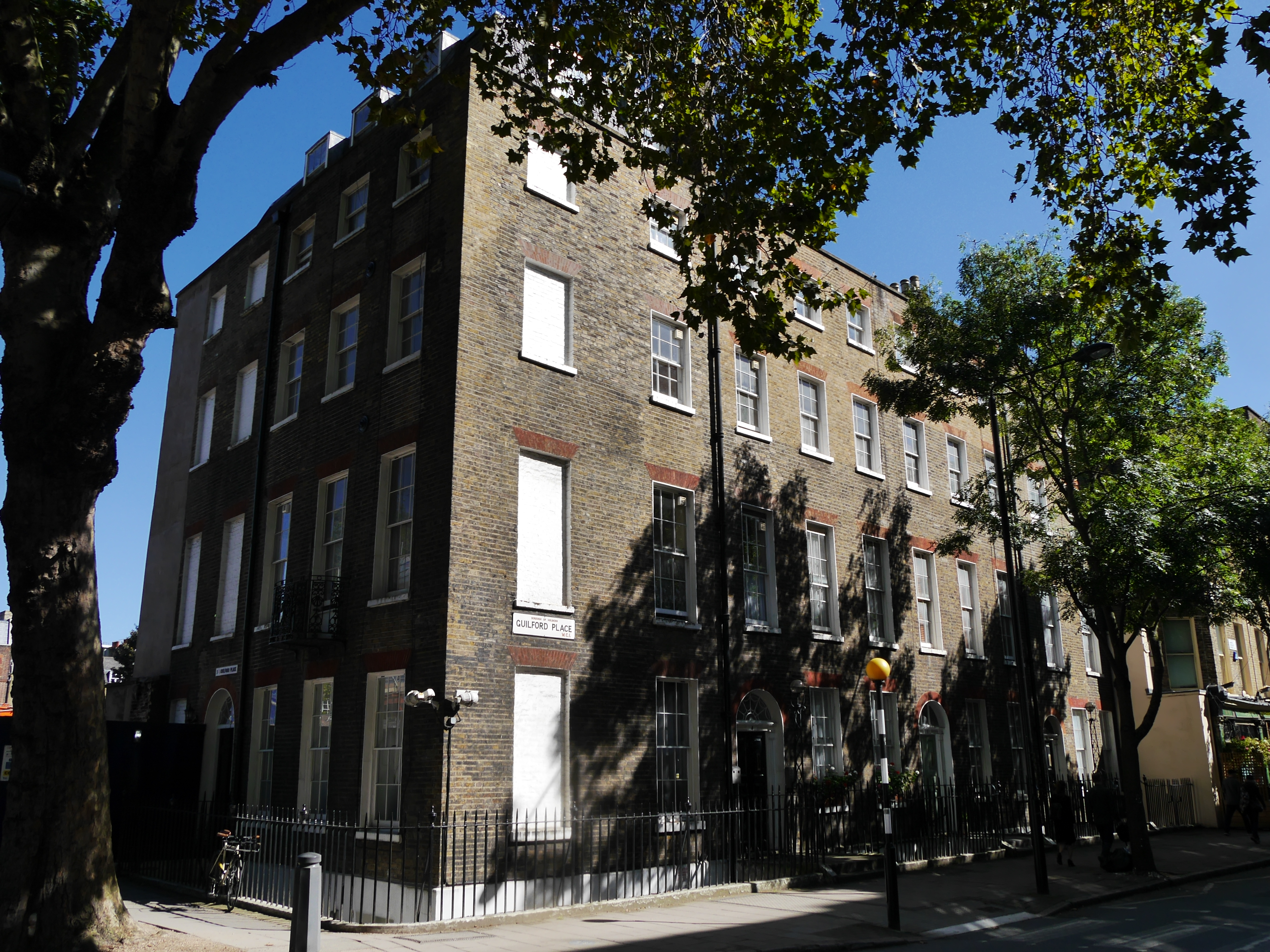
3–6 Guilford Place, London

Guilford Place is a Grade II listed Georgian terrace of four houses in Guilford Place, London WC1, built in about 1791 to 1793 by J. Tomes and W. Harrison.
