= Henry Darbishire =

British architect of the Victoria era

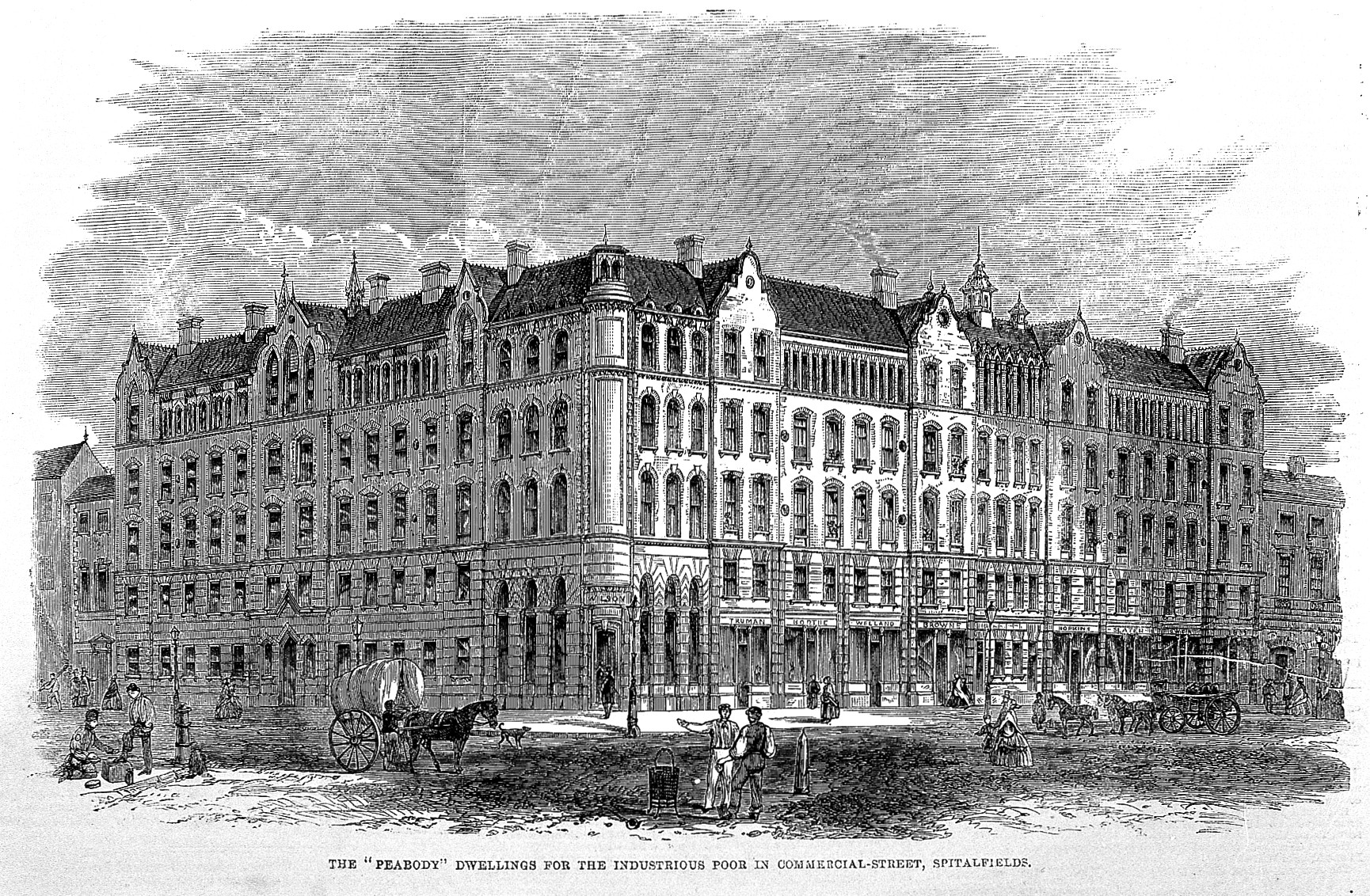
Peabody dwellings, Commercial Street, London, designed by Darbishire: a wood-engraving published in the Illustrated London News in 1863, shortly before the building opened

Henry Astley Darbishire FRIBA JP DL (15 May 1825 – 4 June 1899) was a British architect, best known for working on philanthropic schemes. He worked on projects for Angela Burdett-Coutts, and was the architect for the Peabody Trust from 1863 until 1885, when he was succeeded by Victor Wilkins.

He was born in Chorlton-on-Medlock, Lancashire, the son of James Darbishire and his wife, Mary Roberts. He qualified as a Fellow of the Royal Institute of British Architects in 1856, and finally retired from practice in 1894.

In 1858, Darbishire married Eliza Paget, sister of Sir Ernest Paget. They had three children: Frederic Astley Darbishire (3 November 1859 – 15 March 1926); Eilie Gwendoline Darbishire (1863–1936); and Harry Vernon Darbishire (2 August 1864 – 29 February 1949) and.

He died in 1899 at Oakdene, Edenbridge, Kent.

== Notable works ==
- Columbia Square, Bethnal Green (1857–60), demolished
- Baroness Burdett Coutts Drinking Fountain, Victoria Park, London (1862)
- Peabody dwellings, Commercial Street, Spitalfields (1864)
- Holly Village, Highgate, London (1865)
- Peabody Estate, Islington (1865)
- Columbia Market, Bethnal Green (1866), demolished
- Peabody Estate, Shadwell (1866)
- Guilford Place drinking fountain (1870)
- Peabody Square, Blackfriars Road, Bermondsey (1871)
- Peabody Estate, Pimlico (1876)
- Peabody Estate, Whitechapel (1881)
