= Burma Railway Memorial =

Memorial in Camden Town, London

Coordinates: 51°32′06″N 0°08′20″W

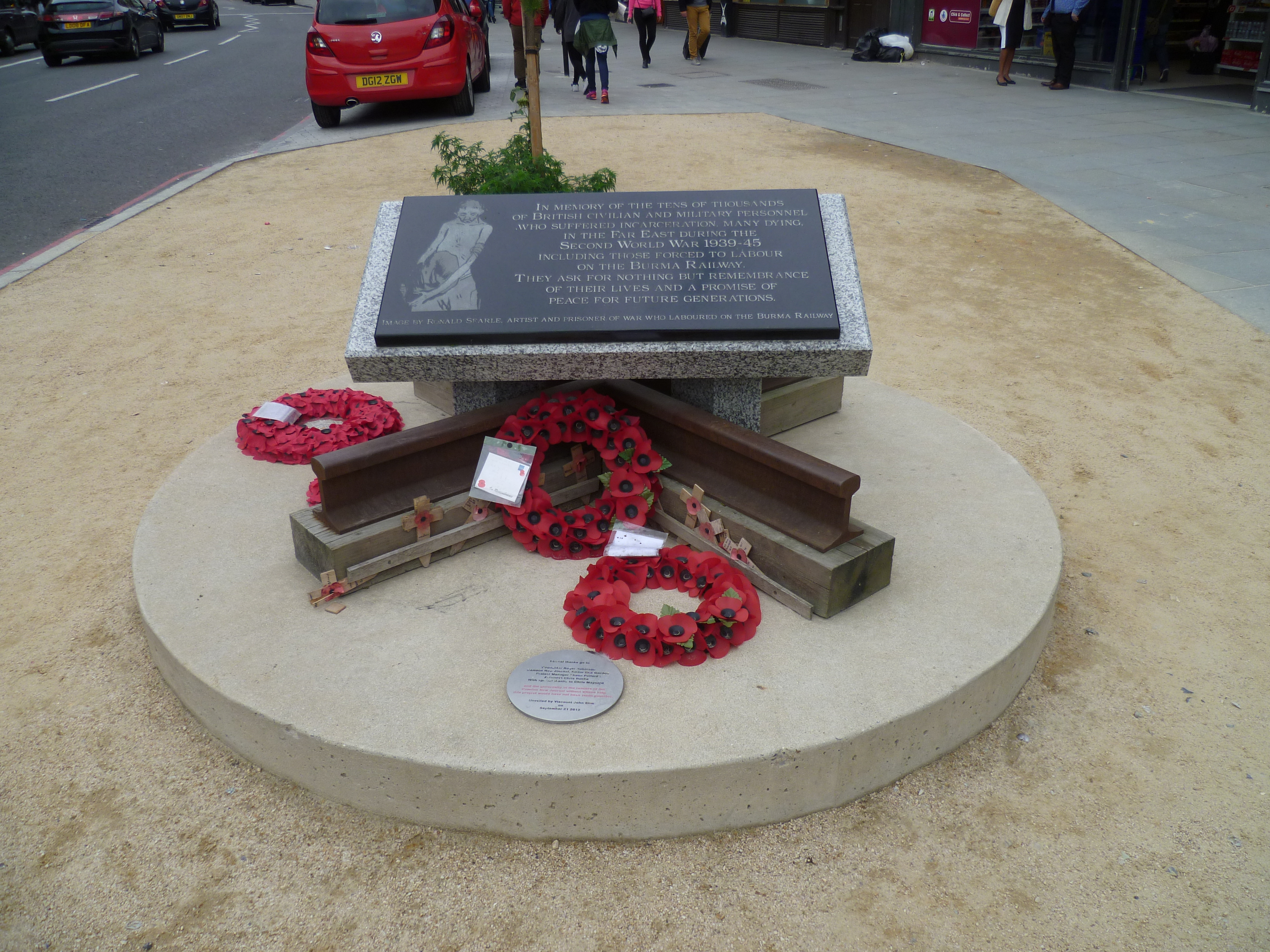
The Burma Railway Memorial

The Burma Railway Memorial is a memorial near Mornington Crescent tube station, in Camden High Street, London, to the thousands of British civilian and military prisoners of war in the Far East who died of disease, starvation or maltreatment while building the Burma Railway during the Second World War .

The memorial was designed by Chris Roche of 11.04 Architects, following a campaign in the Camden New Journal, and features a granite slab supported by short crossed sections of wooden railway sleepers and metal rails, mounted on a white circular plinth. The slab bears an inscription, and is also inscribed with an image of an emaciated Far East prisoner of war (FEPOW) drawn by the artist Ronald Searle, who was himself forced to work on the Burma Railway.

The memorial was unveiled on 21 September 2012 by John Slim, 2nd Viscount Slim, whose father, Field Marshal William Slim, 1st Viscount Slim, commanded the 14th Army in the Burma Campaign during the Second World War.

== See also ==
- National Memorial Arboretum, which contains another Burma Railway Memorial with a 100 ft (30 m) section of the railway
- Kanchanaburi War Cemetery
- Thanbyuzayat War Cemetery
