= Guilford Place =

Street in London

Coordinates: 51°31′23.86″N 0°7′9.6″W

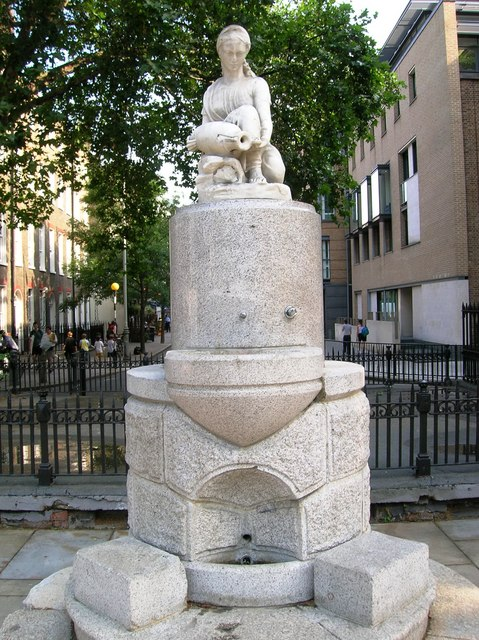
Guilford Place drinking fountain, 2006

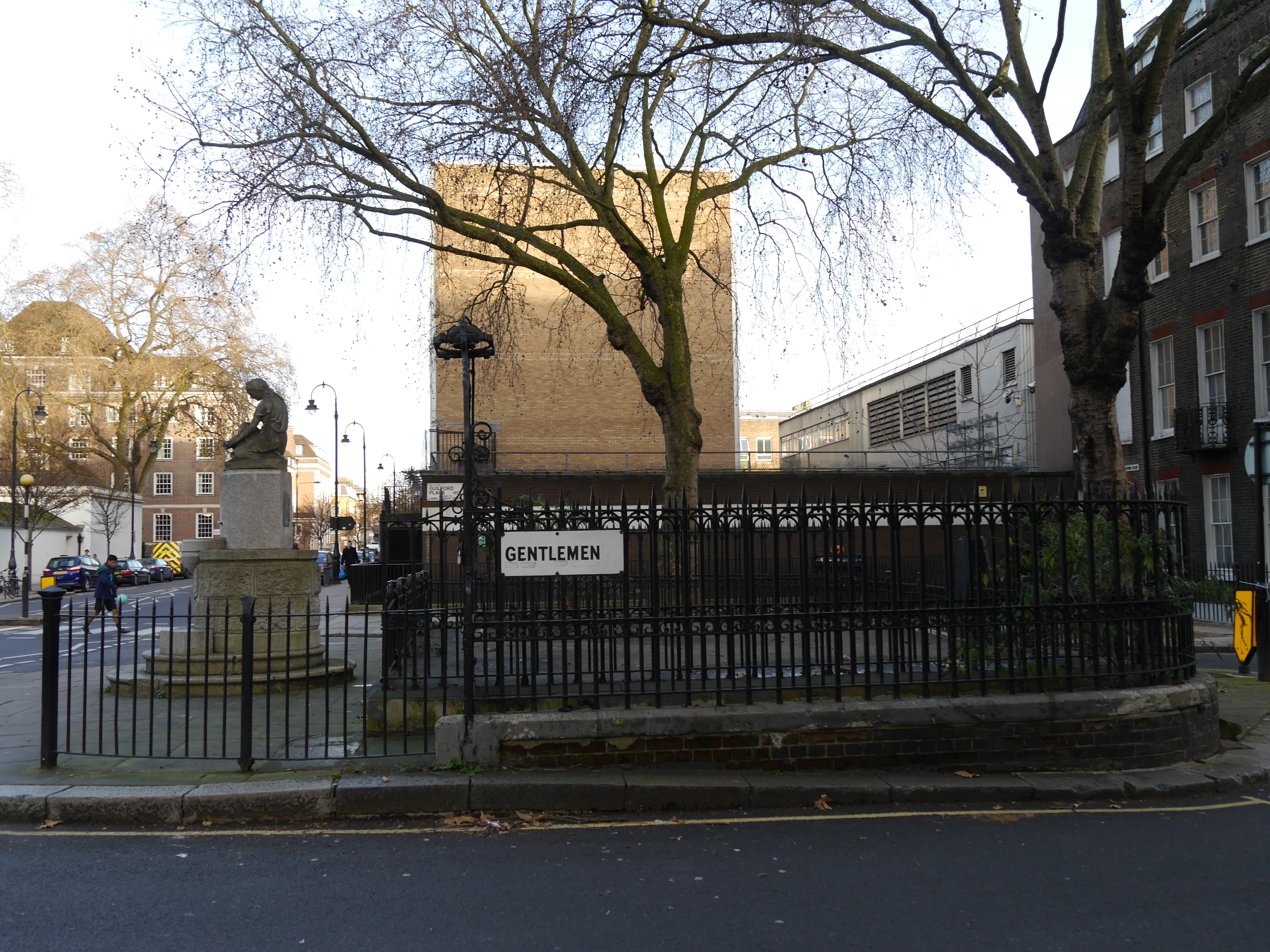
Guilford Place drinking fountain and public conveniences, 2014

Guilford Place is a street in the London Borough of Camden.

It lies opposite and to the south of Coram's Fields. It runs north to south from Guilford Street to where it becomes Lamb's Conduit Street.

3-6 Guilford Place, the public conveniences and the drinking fountain are all Grade II listed by Historic England.
