= Full Circle (sculpture) =

Sculpture by Knut Henrik Henriksen

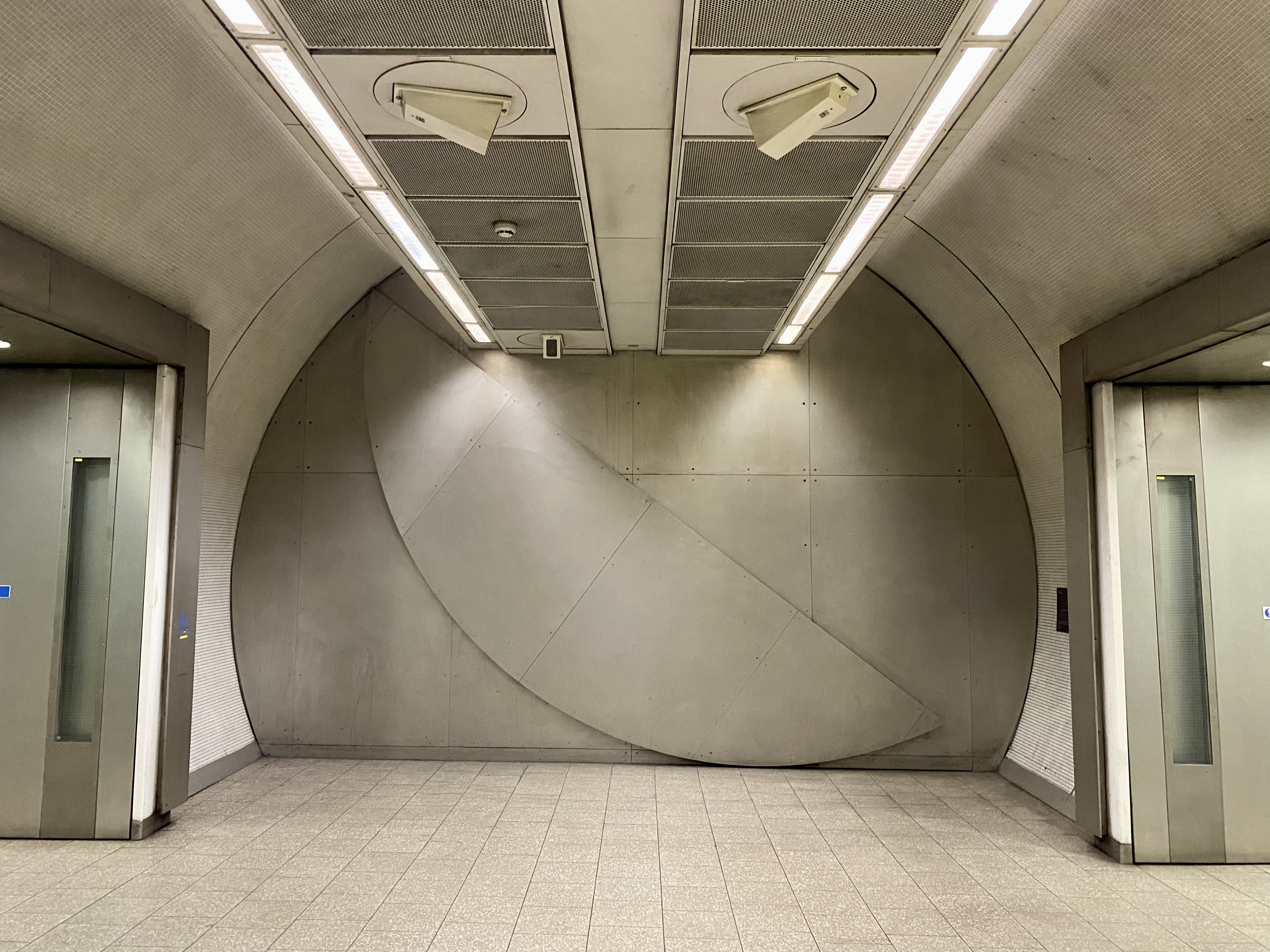
- The Northern line part of Full Circle in December 2022
- Artist: Knut Henrik Henriksen
- Year: 2009 and 2011
- Medium: Stainless steel

Full Circle is a 2009 sculpture by Knut Henrik Henriksen at King's Cross St Pancras tube station.

It was commissioned in 2007 by Art on the Underground as the first permanent artwork to be installed on the Underground since the 1980s. It is made from stainless steel. The work is in two parts; the first half was installed on the Northern line concourse of King's Cross St Pancras tube station in December 2009 and the second part was installed on the Piccadilly line concourse in December 2010.

The Art on the Underground website describes the "apparent simplicity" of the piece as "...borne out of a preciseness of vision that depends on a highly accurate execution to fit the concept and materials of the finishes for the entire station. The works offer a physical and psychological challenge to the architectural qualities of the concourses and an opportunity to contemplate the site and the station". In a chapter on conceptual art in his 2018 book Everything You Know About Art is Wrong, Matt Brown analysed his reactions to the work after its unveiling in 2009. Brown wrote that upon seeing Full Circle he thought "Is that it? ... couldn't they have done something more imaginative?" and dismissed it as a "worthless bit of art that anyone could have cobbled together". Once Brown understood Henriksen's concept behind the work, he felt that this "seemingly mundane installation had caused me to reconsider an environment I thought I knew intimately".

It is located at the end of two new concourses on the Northern and Piccadilly lines.

The creation of the work was supported by Norwegian Embassy in London and the Office for Contemporary Art Norway (OCA).
