= Guilford Place drinking fountain =

Commemorative monument by Henry Darbishire

Coordinates: 51.523470°N 0.119440°W

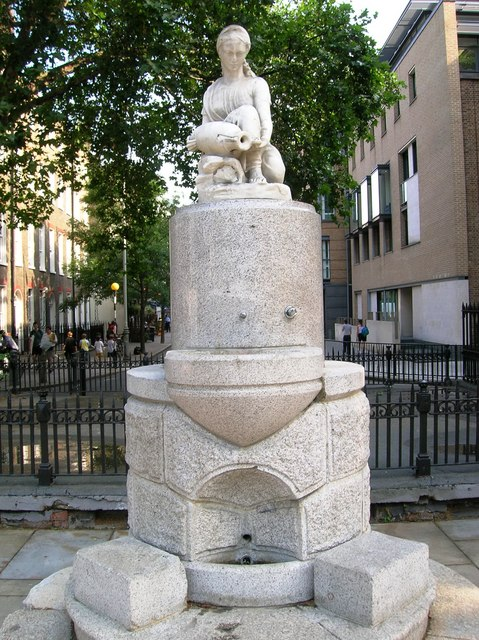
Guilford Place drinking fountain, 2006

The Guilford Place drinking fountain is a Grade II listed drinking fountain at Guilford Place, London WC1, built in about 1870, and designed by the architect Henry Darbishire, for the Misses Whiting to commemorate their mother.
