= Lincoln's Inn War Memorial =

War memorial in London

Coordinates: 51.5163°N 0.1135°W

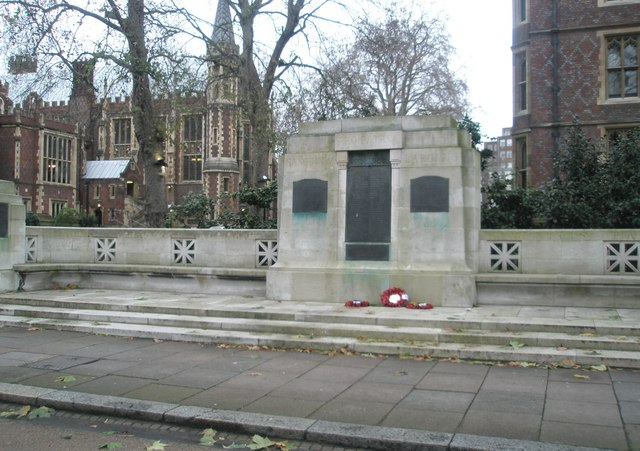

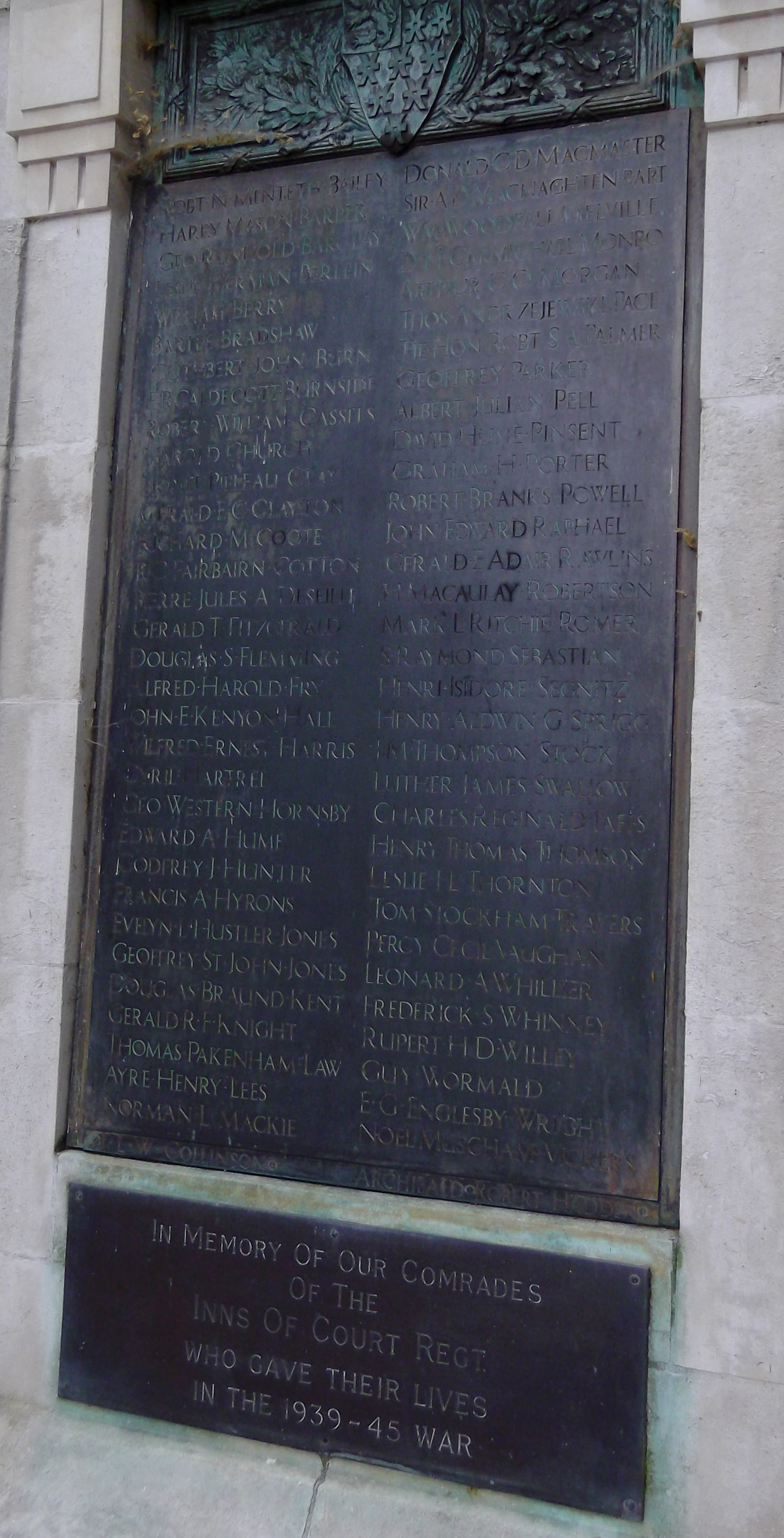

Lincoln's Inn War Memorial is a war memorial in Lincoln's Inn, London. It was erected in 1921 as a memorial to members of the Inn of Court who died on active service during the First World War. It became a Grade II listed building in 1999.

The Portland stone memorial comprises a central pylon with a curved screen incorporating seats to either side, terminating with piers at each end. The ensemble is about 46 feet (14 m) long and stands on a stone base with three steps.

The screen and central monument bears the Latin inscription: "HOSPITIUM SOCIIS / SANGUINEM PRO PATRIA LARGITIS / FILIIS PARENTES" ("Offer your solidarity in honour of the allied sons who generously gave their blood for their country"), which can also be read as two separate inscriptions: "SANGUINEM PRO PATRIA LARGITIS" ("For those who generously gave their blood for their country") and "HOSPITIUM SOCIIS / FILIIS PARENTES" ("Offer your solidarity in honour of the allied sons"). The end piers bear the inscriptions "CIƆ IƆ CCCC XIV" and " CIƆ IƆ CCCC XIX" using Roman numerals in the unusual apostrophus form for the dates 1914 (MDCCCXIV) and 1919 (MDCCCXIX).

Brass plaques on the inside face of each pier record the names of the fallen from the First World War, listing 35 people in total. A bronze plaque on the central pylon listing 66 further names of the fallen from the First World War, in two columns. A further plaque was added listing another 29 names from the Second World War, including Prince George, Duke of Kent.

Other war memorials in Lincoln's Inn include a table, a book of remembrance, a plaque in the chapel, and a memorial to a Zeppelin air raid in 1915.

== See also ==
- Inns of Court War Memorial near Berkhamsted
