= Dorset Estate =

Housing estate in Bethnal Green, London

Coordinates: 51.530°N 0.072°W

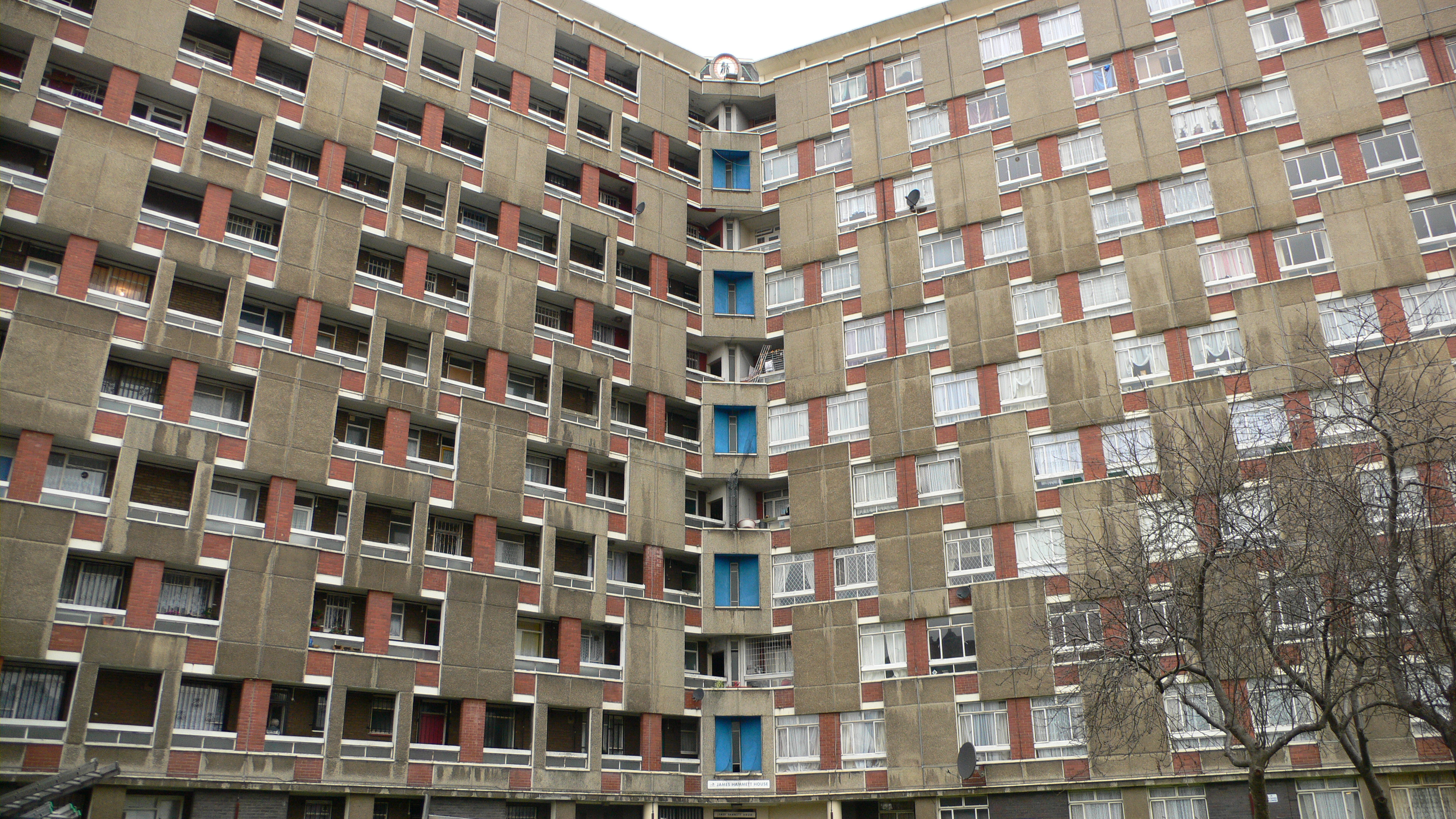
Dorset Estate facade.

The Dorset Estate is a post-war Modernist housing estate in Bethnal Green, London.

== Design ==
The estate was designed by Skinner, Bailey & Lubetkin and completed in 1957. The same architects designed the nearby Sivill House, completed in 1962.

The estate includes two Y-shaped 11-storey blocks, George Loveless House and James Hammett House, and the lower-rise James Brine House, Robert Owen House and Arthur Wade House. The blocks are named after the Tolpuddle Martyrs.

Altogether there are 266 homes on the estate.
