= Sivill House =

Grade II listed housing block in London

Coordinates: 51°31′43″N 0°4′20″W

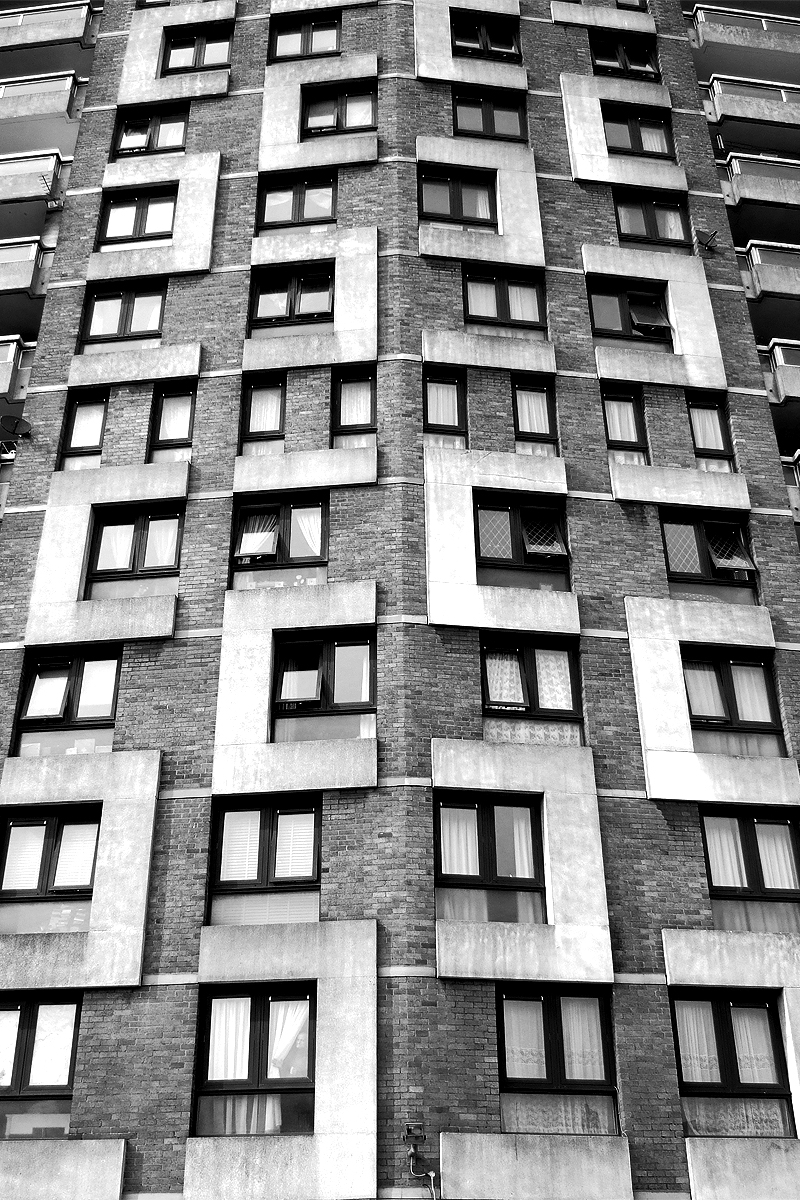
- Interactive map of the Sivill House area

General information
- Construction started: 1963
- Completed: 1966

Sivill House is a Grade II listed 76-flat council housing block on Columbia Road in Shoreditch, in the London Borough of Tower Hamlets. The building has 19-storeys, at a total height of 59 m (194 ft).

Sivill House was designed in the constructivist style by Douglas Bailey, Francis Skinner and Berthold Lubetkin, the successors to the Tecton Group, and was completed in 1962. The nearby Dorset Estate was designed by the same team.
