= Gloucester Gate =

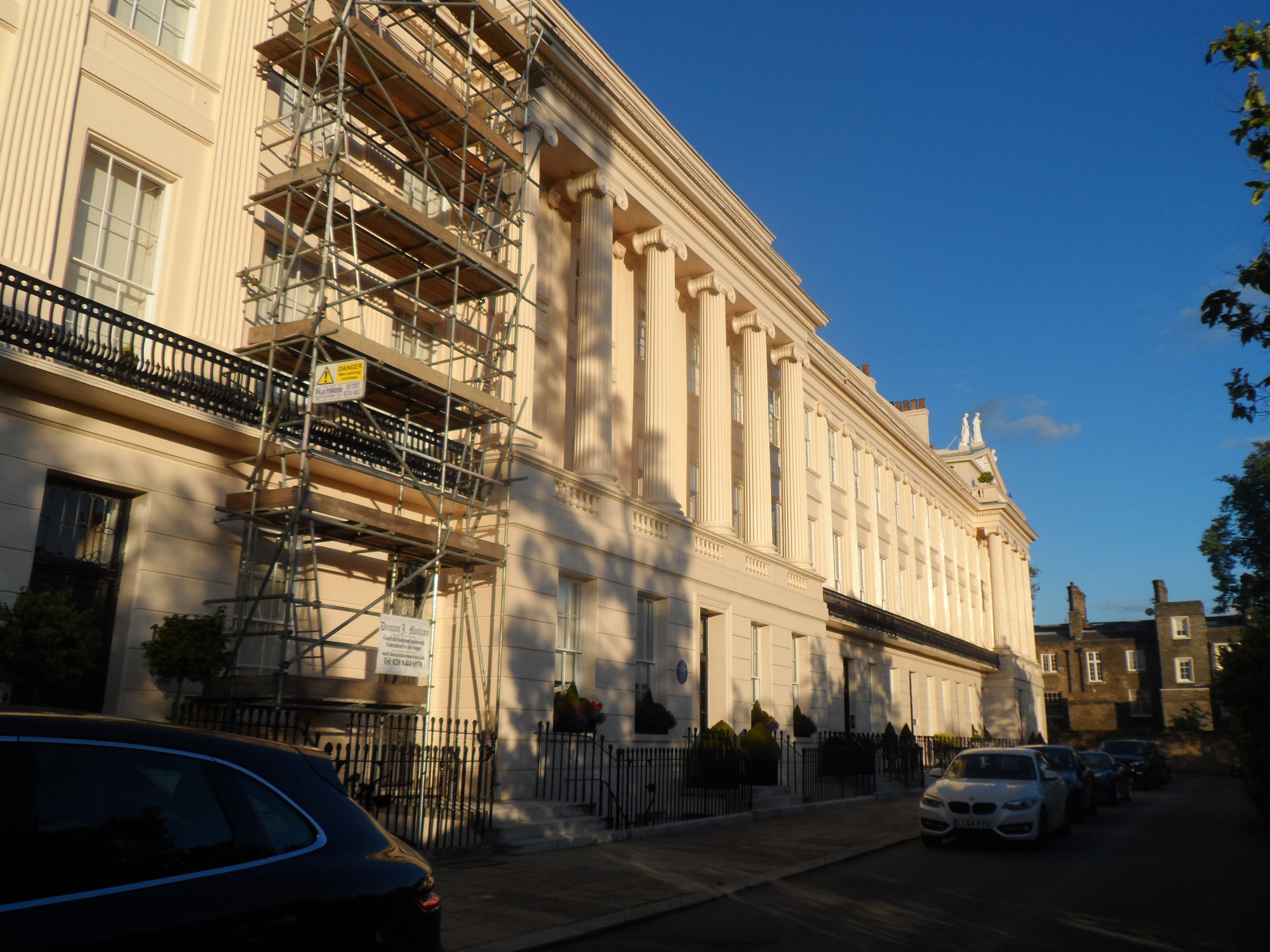
- Gloucester Gate

- Shown in Westminster
- 51.5346°N 0.1473°W
- Location: Regent's Park

History
- Built: 1827

Site notes
- Architect: John Nash

Listed Building – Grade I
- Designated: 14 May 1974
- Reference no.: 1078322

Gloucester Gate is a residential facility in Regent's Park, London. It is a Grade I listed building.

== History ==
The building was designed by John Nash and built by Richard Mott, being completed in 1827. The building, which features a range of fluted pilasters of the Ionic order on pedestal bases, was originally built as eleven terraced houses. No. 6 was the home of the pharmaceutical entrepreneur, Sir Henry Wellcome, while No. 15 was the home of the author, W. W. Jacobs.
