= Dame Louisa Aldrich-Blake Memorial =

Memorial in Bloomsbury, London

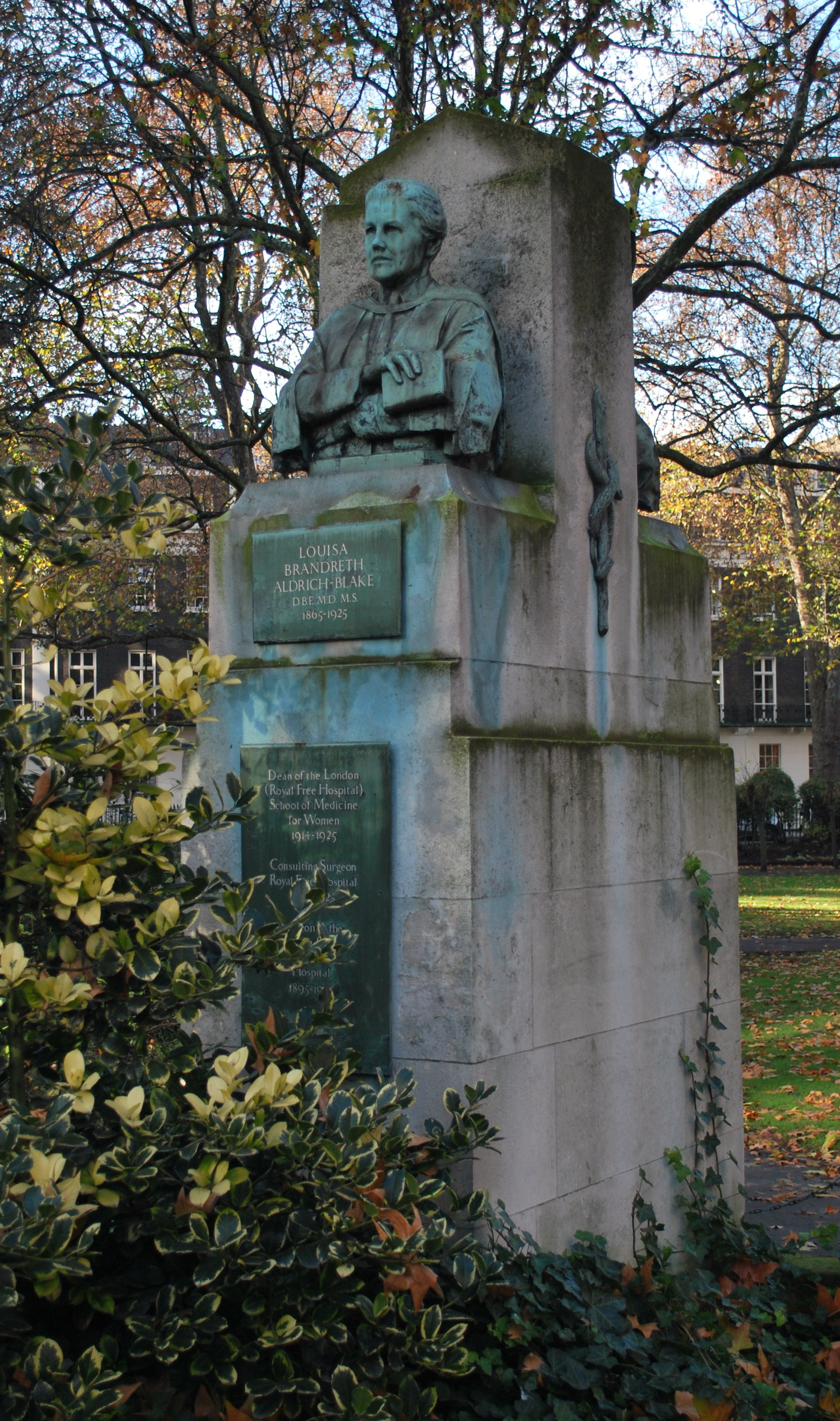
- Artist: Arthur George Walker (sculptor); Sir Edwin Lutyens (architect)
- Year: 1926; 100 years ago
- Medium: Bronze and stone
- Subject: Louisa Aldrich-Blake
- Location: Tavistock Square Gardens, London, WC1H United Kingdom; 51°31′29″N 0°07′41″W

Listed Building – Grade II
- Official name: Memorial to Dame Louisa Aldrich Blake in Tavistock Square Gardens
- Designated: 14 May 1974
- Reference no.: 1244104

The Dame Louisa Aldrich-Blake Memorial is a bronze and stone memorial honouring British surgeon and educator Dame Louisa Aldrich-Blake, the first woman to receive the degree of Master of Surgery. Aldrich-Blake worked at the New Hospital for Women and Children (later renamed the Elizabeth Garrett Anderson and Obstetric Hospital) and Royal Free Hospital, and also served as dean of the London School of Medicine for Women, the country's first medical school to train women doctors. She pioneered surgical treatment for cervical cancer and colorectal cancer, and also volunteered for the Red Cross during World War I.

The identical bronze busts on the memorial were sculpted by Arthur George Walker and the memorial was designed by noted architect Sir Edwin Lutyens. It was unveiled in 1926, shortly after Aldrich-Blake's death. The memorial was listed in 1974. It is located on the southeast corner of Tavistock Square Gardens in Bloomsbury, London, one of several public artworks in the Gardens.

== Description ==
The Dame Louisa Aldrich-Blake Memorial is a bronze and stone memorial honouring British surgeon and educator Louisa Aldrich-Blake. There are two identical bronze busts, each measuring 85 centimetres (33 in) tall, 59 centimetres (23 in) wide and 40 centimetres (16 in) in diameter, depicting Aldrich-Blake holding a book which is inscribed with aspects of her career. Each bust is mounted on one side of a stone column measuring 2.30 metres (7 ft 7 in) tall. On the opposite sides of the column are bronze serpents wrapped around a staff, the Rod of Asclepius. The column rests on a semi-circular stone bench with a seat back.

The inscriptions on the bronze plaques read:

(top plaque, south and north sides)
LOUISA
BRANDRETH
ALDRICH-BLAKE
D.B.E. M.D. M.S.
1865 - 1925

(bottom plaque, south and north sides)
Dean of the London
(Royal Free Hospital)
School of Medicine
for Women
1914 - 1925

Consulting Surgeon
Royal Free Hospital
1919 - 1925

Surgeon to the
Elizabeth Garrett
Anderson
Hospital
1895 - 1925

(bottom plaque, south side)
Glorious is the fruit
of good labour

(bottom plaque, north side)
The path of the just
is as a shining light

The memorial is located on the southeast corner of Tavistock Square Gardens in Bloomsbury, London, with one bust facing the Gardens and the other facing the street. The other artworks in the Gardens are the statue of Mahatma Gandhi, a bust of Virginia Woolf, a memorial to victims of the 7 July 2005 London bombings, the Conscientious Objectors Commemorative Stone and a tree planted in honour of victims of the bombing of Hiroshima.

== History ==
=== Biography ===
Louisa Aldrich-Blake was born in 1865 in Chingford, Essex, and attended Cheltenham Ladies' College before enrolling in 1887 at the London School of Medicine for Women (LSMW), the country's first medical school to train women doctors. She received her Doctor of Medicine degree in 1894 and the following year became the first woman to receive the degree of Master of Surgery. She began working as assistant surgeon at the New Hospital for Women and Children (renamed the Elizabeth Garrett Anderson and Obstetric Hospital in 1918) in London, later being promoted to senior surgeon while also working at the Royal Free Hospital. At the Royal Free, Aldrich-Blake became the hospital's first woman surgical registrar and anaesthetist.

Aldrich-Blake pioneered surgical treatment for cervical cancer and colorectal cancer, while also working as an educator. She was named dean of the LSMW in 1914, training other women doctors while also continuing her work as a surgeon. She volunteered her services for the Red Cross during World War I, spending her holidays between 1914 and 1916 working at military hospitals in France where she was nicknamed Madame la Générale. For her many years of service in medicine and education, Aldrich-Blake was made a Dame Commander of the Order of the British Empire (DBE) at the 1925 New Year Honours. She continued working until her death on 28 December 1925.

=== Memorial ===
President of the Royal Free Sir George Riddell served as chairman of a committee to raise funds for a memorial to Aldrich-Blake. Donations were raised by her relatives, colleagues and students of the school where she taught, with funds also raised for a scholarship named in her honour. The memorial was designed by prominent architect Sir Edwin Lutyens, whose works in London include the BMA House on Tavistock Square, The Cenotaph on Whitehall, the Civil Service Rifles War Memorial at Somerset House and the Tower Hill Memorial on Tower Hill. The busts were sculpted by artist Arthur George Walker. His works in London include the statue of Florence Nightingale on Waterloo Place and the Emmeline and Christabel Pankhurst Memorial in the Victoria Tower Gardens.

The memorial was unveiled on 4 July 1927, near the former school and hospital where she once worked. The dedication ceremony was presided over by physician Dame Mary Scharlieb and those in attendance included many who were affiliated with the school and hospitals where Aldrich-Blake taught and worked. The memorial was unveiled by Sir William Beveridge, vice chancellor of the University of London. During his speech, Beveridge said the "monument called to mind a singularly gifted personality, one who lived a very happy life, happy not only in itself, but in its power of conferring happiness on others." Noting its location in an area of the city where more educational institutions were being established, he said "students in increasing numbers would pass that spot, and they would be reminded thereby of one of the great pioneers in the professional education of women." Riddell spoke about the positive attributes of Aldrich-Blake and said he hoped it would inspire patriotism. Additional tributes were made by physicians Elizabeth Bolton and Lady Florence Barrett. Aldrich-Blake's brother, Reverend F. H. Aldrich-Blake, gave the benediction. The memorial was Grade II listed on 14 May 1974.

== Gallery ==
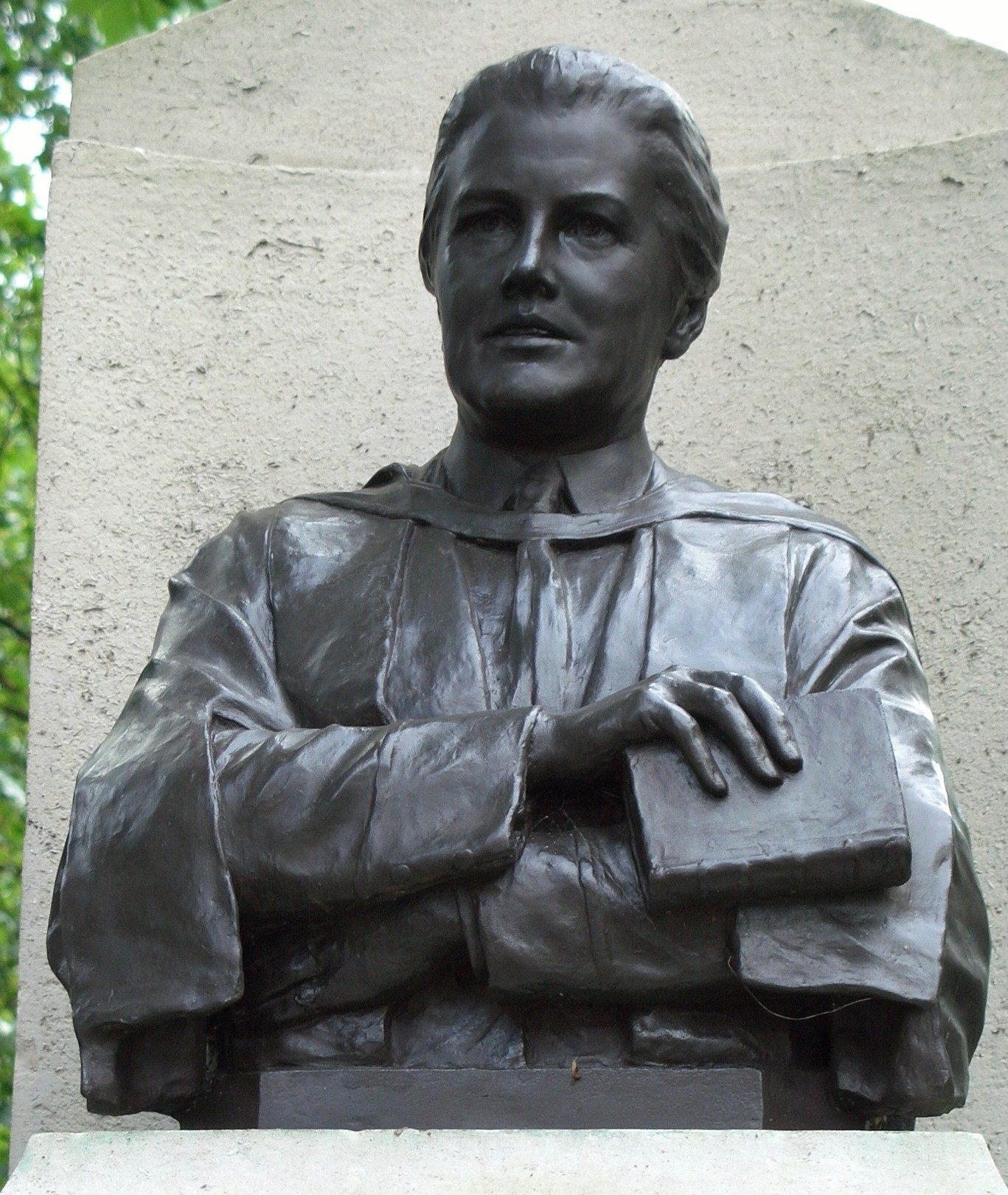
Closeup of one of the identical busts

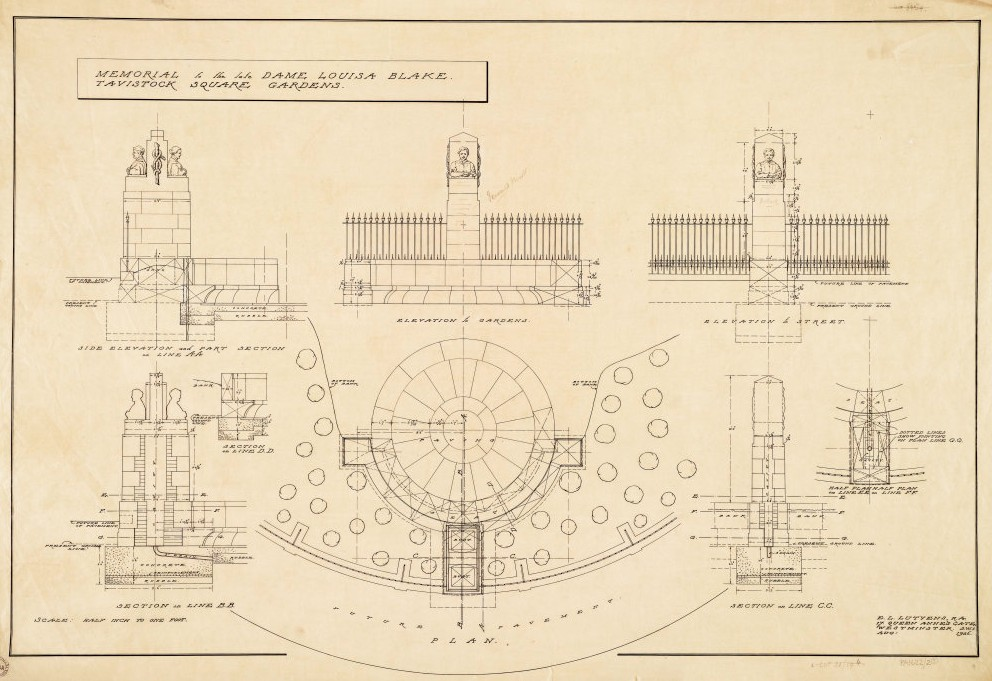
Design for the memorial by Sir Edwin Lutyens

== See also ==
- List of public art in the London Borough of Camden
