= Fredda Brilliant =

Polish sculptor and actress (1903–1999)

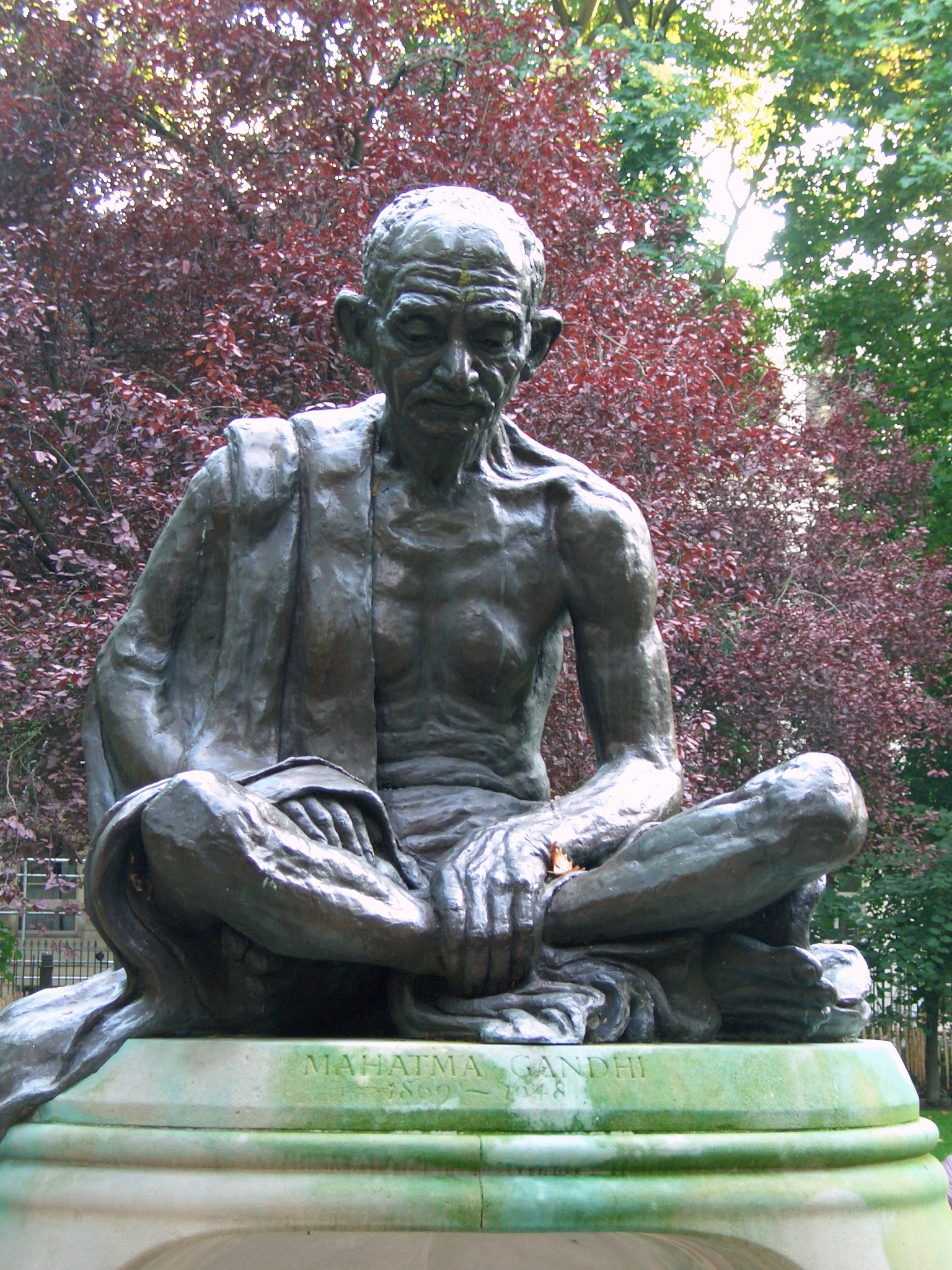
- Brilliant's statue of Mahatma Gandhi, Tavistock Square, London
- Born: 7 April 1903; Łódź, Poland
- Died: 25 May 1999 (aged 96); Carbondale, Illinois, United States
- Known for: sculpture, writing, acting, singing
- Spouse: Herbert Marshall

Fredda Brilliant (7 April 1903 – 25 May 1999) was a Polish sculptor and actress, born in Łódź, Poland.

She worked in a variety of media and is recognized as an accomplished sculptor, writer, actor, singer and script writer. Throughout her career she traveled extensively working in England, USA, Australia, India, Poland and Russia. Brilliant sculpted some of the greatest figures of her time including Jawaharlal Nehru, V.K. Krishna Menon, Indira Gandhi, U.S. President John F Kennedy, and Buckminster Fuller. She also sculpted her husband, the writer Herbert Marshall. Her writing credits include Biographies in Bronze (1986), The Black Virgin (1986), Women in power (1987) and Truth in Fiction (1986).

Brilliant's most famous work is a bronze statue of Mahatma Gandhi which is the centerpiece of the park in Tavistock Square, London, UK.

== Early career ==
Fredda Brilliant emigrated with her Jewish parents to Melbourne, Australia in 1924. The Brilliant family were active in Yiddish theatrical and cultural circles. During her spell in Australia she honed her acting talent and also co-founded a Melbourne Theatre, in the late 1920s she moved to New York City to embark on a career as an actress. In 1935 whilst living in Moscow she married the esteemed film-writer and lecturer, Herbert Marshall; the two remained in Russia until 1937 when they moved to London.

In 1939 Fredda and Marshall completed the script for the socialist film, The Proud Valley which was released the following year. As war broke out Fredda began touring with a theatrical company and most notably appeared in the production of Robert Ardrey's 1939 anti-fascist play Thunder Rock alongside Michael Redgrave and then Albert Finney at The Globe in London in 1947. In 1949 she co-produced, with Marshall, the drama-documentary film Tinker.

During the 1950s and early 1960s Fredda and Herbert lived in India where he lectured and made government films and she sculpted some of the most significant figures of the age including Jawaharlal Nehru, V.K Krishna Menon and Indira Gandhi. In 1966 the couple returned to the USA where he was offered a professorship in Soviet and East European studies at the University of Southern Illinois at Carbondale. Other notable figures to have been sculpted by Fredda Brilliant include Buckminster Fuller, Maurice Bowra, Francis Warner and Duncan Grant.

== Sculptures ==
Fredda Brilliant received no formal artistic training and was primarily self-taught, her early work began as a child sculpting models of children in the courtyard outside her house. At first she gave them away but was later encouraged to sell them. Her early successes are quoted in an article in Faces magazine from 1978: 'We made enough money to buy two ice creams. One we shared, the other we gave away. So, at four years old, I learned how to be a creator, and how important it is to be a manager."

She was keen to depict women in her work, once quoted as saying "I ask you: How many replicas of women are there about? Boadicea, the nurse Cavell. It is ridiculous, it is unfair." "It is important that women, too, are remembered. For all they do."

Other famous subjects sculpted by Brilliant included: Dr Rajendra Prasad, Pandit Nehru, Vallabhbhai Patel, Morarji Desai, V. K. Krishna Menon, Dr Harekrushna Mahatab, S. K. Patil, G. D. Birla, Dr Yashwant Singh Parmar, the Maharaja of Baroda, Chief Justice M. C. Chagla, Sri Karmarkar, Anna Ornsholt, Muhammad Ali, U.S. President John F. Kennedy, Professor R. Buckminster Fuller, Taras Shevchenko, Anton Chekhov, Vladimir Mayakovsky, Sergei Eisenstein, Andrey Voznesensky, Lionel Britton, Sir Maurice Bowra, Professor Herbert Marshall, Antoni Słonimski, Lord Elwyn Jones, Dr Delyte Morris, Dr Francis Warner, Bernard Ostry, Sir Isaac Hayward, Max Meldrum, Nadia Nerina, Julian Carroll and Alban Barkley, Carl Albert, Melvin Price, Terry-Thomas, Willy Gallagher, Tom Mann, Kay Harrison, Pera Attasheva, Professor Hyman Levy, Duncan Grant, Galina Yevtushenko, Georgi Dimitrov, Joseph Wolfing, Pavlik Morozov, and Sir John Rothenstein.

Pablo Picasso invited Brilliant to visit him at his home and use him as a subject, but she refused when he pinched her bottom while her husband was present.

Around fifty of her plaster models and maquettes are in the private possession of her niece. The maquette for the statue of Gandhi was shown on the BBC programme Antiques Roadshow in April 2013.
