= The Proud Valley =

1940 film by Pen Tennyson

- Original UK quad format film poster
- Directed by: Pen Tennyson
- Written by: Louis Golding; Pen Tennyson; Jack Jones
- Story by: Fredda Brilliant; Herbert Marshall
- Produced by: Michael Balcon
- Starring: Paul Robeson; Edward Chapman; Simon Lack; Rachel Thomas
- Edited by: Ray Pitt
- Production company: Ealing Studios
- Distributed by: ABFD (UK)
- Release dates: 2 January 1940 (London, premiere)
- Running time: 76 minutes
- Country: United Kingdom
- Language: English

The Proud Valley is a 1940 Ealing Studios film starring Paul Robeson. Filmed in the South Wales coalfield, the principal Welsh coal mining area, the film is about an African American seaman who joins a mining community. It includes their passion for singing as well as the dangers and precariousness of working in a mine.

== Plot ==
David Goliath is an African-American sailor who deserts his ship when it arrives in Wales. He climbs onto the back of a freight train and meets Bert, who is work-shy and scoffs at David's determination to seek employment. The train arrives at a small mining town and the two men briefly attempt to busk before being scolded by Mrs Parry for making unpleasant noise outside her shop. They stop outside a building where a male choir are rehearsing and David begins singing along. The choir conductor, Dick Parry, is determined to make David a member and offers him lodgings at his house. Despite his wife, Mrs Parry, objecting to the idea, her protests are moot when their sons and daughters side with their father. Dick gets David a job as a miner to work along with him and his eldest son Emlyn, much to the racist objections of one of the workers, but Dick and David accidentally mine close to gas, causing a fire, in which many miners perish. Emlyn was not present at the site that morning and rushes into the mine as a rescuer; David carries Dick out of the fire but is unable to save him.

A month later, Dick's choir appears at a competition but only David performs for Dick's memory. The mine has been closed since the disaster and the rest of the miners are reduced to gathering coal from the top of a spoil heap, but they are unable to make the same amount of money that the mine had paid them and many have to claim social benefits. A year later, Mrs Parry is struggling with five children to care for and is visited by Mrs Owen—the mother of Emlyn's fiancée, Gwen—who snaps that Gwen is not allowed marry Emlyn because he cannot make enough money to look after her. Gwen later sneaks to the Parry house and tells Emlyn that she would marry him no matter his income, which gives Emlyn the idea to march to London and demand that the government reopens the mine. Emlyn takes David and two other miners and they walk to London, and arrive the day after Germany invaded Poland. The British government are busy focusing on building up the army and reopen the mine to send the gatecrashers away. The team return to Wales and attempt to reopen the mine, but a large fire causes the mine to collapse which traps the team inside. Their candle flickers, indicating the oxygen is disappearing and one of the miners estimates they have an hour left until suffocation. One miner finds a weak rock and tries to break through with a pickaxe but he and David fail. Emlyn decides to leave the group to explode an exit through with dynamite, but, knowing that it could lead to another Parry death, David sneaks away as the rest of their team pray and punches Emlyn unconscious, activating the dynamite and breaking through the rock. The other two miners wake up Emlyn, discover David's lifeless body nearby and pray for David's soul. The mine is reopened and the town sing in unison as the coal is transported through the mine.

== Cast ==
- Paul Robeson as David Goliath
- Edward Chapman as Dick Parry
- Simon Lack as Emlyn Parry
- Rachel Thomas as Mrs Parry
- Dilys Thomas as Dilys
- Edward Rigby as Bert
- Janet Johnson as Gwen Owen
- Charles Williams as Evans
- Jack Jones as Thomas
- Dilys Davies as Mrs Owen
- Clifford Evans as Seth Jones
- Allan Jeayes as Mr Trevor
- George Merritt as Mr. Lewis
- Edward Lexy as Commissionaire
- Noel Howlett as Company clerk
- Ben Williams as Will Morgan (uncredited)
- Leslie Phillips (uncredited)

== Production ==
From a treatment entitled David Goliath by the married writing team of Herbert Marshall and Fredda Brilliant, friends of Robeson in Highgate and Moscow, The Proud Valley's script was written by Louis Golding with the help of the novelist Jack Jones.

Robeson's role was based on the real-life adventures of a Black miner from West Virginia who drifted to Wales by way of England, searching for work. After two years of refusing offers from major studios, Robeson agreed to appear in this independent British production, seeing (he told The Glasgow Sentinel) an opportunity to "depict the Negro as he really is—not the caricature he is always represented to be on the screen."

Filming was completed in September 1939 but producer Michael Balcon and director Pen Tennyson were forced to re-cut the ending of the film in the new jingoistic atmosphere following the outbreak of war. An ending in which the workers took control of the mine was replaced with a scene in which management agreed to make concessions to the miners. Michael Balcon wrote "It was not, perhaps, quite the film Pen wanted to make in the first instance, but it was an unqualified success. We were all pleased with it, including Pen, who was very self-critical."

== Release ==
In December 1939, the film was unofficially previewed in Neath Port Talbot and, according to newspaper articles at the time, was well received by the Welsh audience who commented on the authenticity of background and detail.

The first film to premiere on radio, on 25 February 1940, The Proud Valley was first screened to the trade & cinema bookers on the 9 January 1940 before opening to the public on screens nationwide, including the Birmingham Gaumont and the Middlesbrough Hippodrome, from the 3 March 1940 onwards, and in London at the Leicester Square Theatre on the 8th.

According to Kinematograph Weekly it was one of the most successful British films at the local box office in 1940.

Michael Balcon claims that because of Robeson's pro-Russian views, at a time when Russia was an ally of Nazi Germany, Lord Beaverbrook was opposed to the movie and there was very little mention of it in his newspapers.

== Critical reception ==
Robeson's criticism of British and French appeasement and strident pro-Soviet statements (immediately after the signing of the Nazi-Soviet Pact) led to his (and by extension the film) being placed on a publicity blacklist by Lord Beaverbrook, proprietor of the Daily Express. However, the Monthly Film Bulletin described the film as a "moving and enthrallingly interesting story of courage, endurance and self-sacrifice," praising it as "an outstanding achievement for all concerned" and singling out Pen Tennyson's "sensitive and skillful" direction and Robeson's "impressive presence" and "glorious voice".

Variety disparaged the film as possessing "not much dramatic wealth" and compared it unfavourably with Carol Reed's The Stars Look Down. The reviewer also complained that Robeson "delivers only two songs and neither solo". The New York Times reviewer criticised the “purple” acting and rambling plot, but praised the authenticity of the atmosphere and the singing: “it has the virtue of sincerity, and it is lyrical when it sings.”

The film critic Matthew Sweet declared in 2005 that if the film had been completed before the outbreak of war "it would have been the most uncompromisingly Marxist picture ever produced in Anglophone cinema".

== Legacy ==
=== Significance ===
In The Proud Valley, Robeson depicts a kind of Black hero rarely seen in Hollywood, one who fuses his political and artistic sensibilities in the image of a Black working man who achieves kinship across boundaries of race and nationality. Years later, Robeson would remark that, of all his films, this was his favorite because it showed workers in a positive light.

=== Radio premiere ===
The Proud Valley was the first film premiered on radio. An hour long edit of the film was broadcast on the BBC Home Service a week and a half before its London release.

=== Stage adaptation ===
In 2025 it was announced that a stage adaptation is in active development under StudioCanal's new label StudioCanal On Stage.

== See also ==
- How Green Was My Valley (1941)
- The Stars Look Down (1940)
- Love on the Dole (1941)
