= Conscientious Objectors Commemorative Stone =

Memorial in London

Coordinates: 51.525361°N 0.129528°W

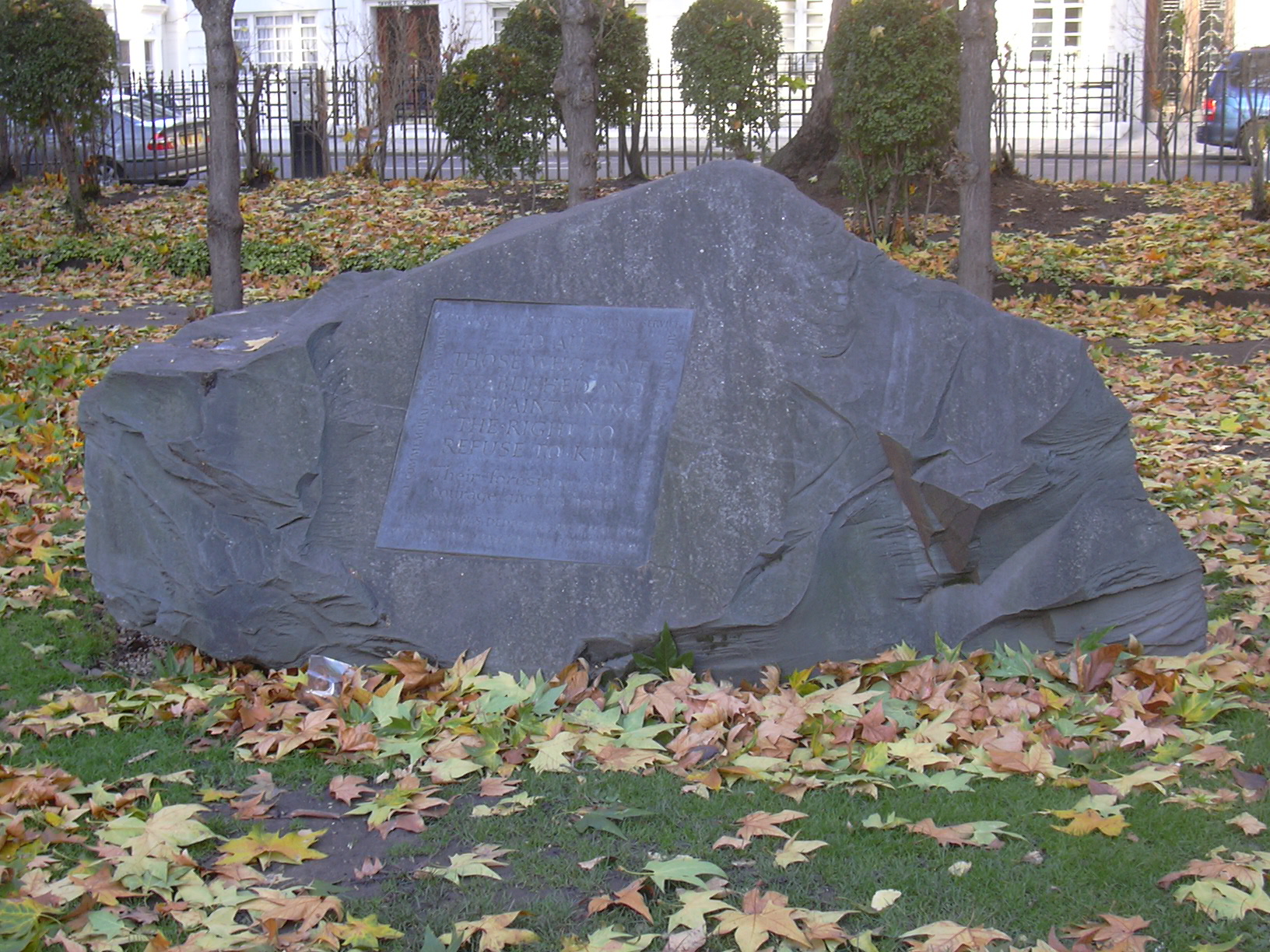
Conscientious Objectors Commemorative Stone

The Conscientious Objectors' Commemorative Stone is on the north side of Tavistock Square, Bloomsbury, in the London Borough of Camden.

In 1994 a stone commemorating "men and women conscientious objectors all over the world and in every age" by Hugh Court was unveiled in Tavistock Square.

== Erection ==
The erection of this massive slate stone to commemorate the struggle of conscientious objectors past and present was co-ordinated by Edna Mathieson with support from the Peace Pledge Union (PPU) and unveiled by Sir Michael Tippett, President of the PPU and a former Conscientious Objector, on 15 May 1994 in Tavistock Square.

== History ==
The idea of having a stone dedicated to conscientious objectors (COs) to war began in 1976 at the funeral of a conscientious objector, Joseph Brett, who had been imprisoned in 1916. Bill McIlroy, then Secretary of the National Secular Society (NSS), officiated, and happened to remark that perhaps one day COs would be commemorated, as armed forces personnel are, both nationally and locally in the places where they lived.

Edna Mathieson, niece of Joseph Brett, and a member of the Inner London Education Authority (sub group of the Greater London Council), approached the GLC for help, and in 1981 the GLC Labour Group accepted the idea and the Greater London Regional Labour Party agreed. But when, after the abolition of the GLC in 1986, the London Residuary Board took over the GLC's commitments, agreement to a physical commemoration of COs was lost. Mathieson turned to Lambeth Council, and Lambeth initiated a competition in all London art schools for a suitable piece of sculpture, to be set up next to County Hall (GLC's headquarters), situated in Lambeth. Lambeth Council then found that, because of cuts, it could not afford to sponsor the arrangements for such a monument.

Finally, Mathieson approached the PPU, who agreed to help with the whole concept, including design, location and raising finances. Camden Council (its local council) was asked for permission to erect a stone in Tavistock Square. On 15 May 1993, International Conscientious Objectors' Day, a public appeal was launched by means of a letter in The Guardian, headed by Sir Michael Tippett.

Granite had been considered as material, as it is the strongest stone – symbolic of those who refused against the odds to fight. However, when the PPU's architectural adviser, Hugh Court, and sculptor, Paul Wehrle, went to Cumbria in search of a stone, they were so attracted to a naturally shaped piece of grey-green volcanic slate, some 400 million years old and rather larger than the size originally envisaged, they chose that.

The PPU decided upon the form of words for the stone with an addition of "Their foresight and courage give us hope", written by a Dublin wordsmith.

== Annual act of remembrance ==
In 1998 Mathieson pressed for the rest of Bill McIlroy's idea to be implemented - an annual event for the commemoration of all COs. A planning group was established at a Conway Hall meeting (in the Bertrand Russell Room) and Jess Hodgkins, a Unitarian, suggested the group be called the Right to Refuse to Kill Group (RRK). Ever since there has been an annual memorial event every year at noon on 15 May, International Conscientious Objectors' Day.

== Inscriptions ==
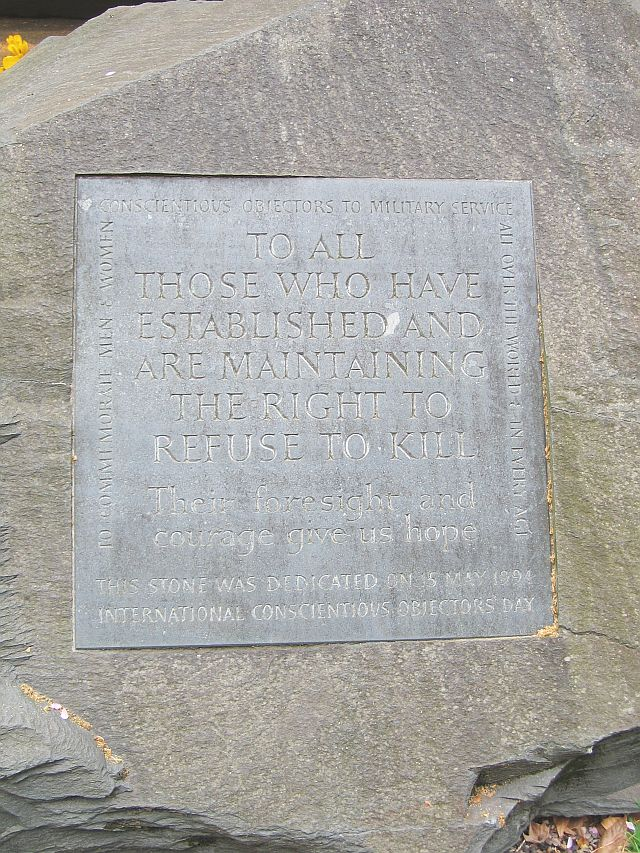
Stone inscription

Around the left, top, and right edges:

TO COMMEMORATE MEN & WOMEN
CONSCIENTIOUS OBJECTORS TO MILITARY SERVICE
ALL OVER THE WORLD & IN EVERY AGE

In the centre:

TO ALL THOSE WHO HAVE
ESTABLISHED AND
ARE MAINTAINING
THE RIGHT TO
REFUSE TO KILL

Their foresight and
courage give us hope

Along the bottom edge:

THIS STONE WAS DEDICATED ON 15 MAY 1994
INTERNATIONAL CONSCIENTIOUS OBJECTORS' DAY

== Nearby related public art ==
Also in Tavistock Square is a statue of Mahatma Gandhi, sculpted by Fredda Brilliant and installed in 1968 and a cherry tree planted in 1967 in memory of the victims of the nuclear bombing of Hiroshima and Nagasaki.

With the Conscientious Objectors Commemorative Stone, the three features have led to the square unofficially being regarded by some as a peace park or garden. Annual ceremonies are held at each of these memorials including International Conscientious Objectors Day, 15 May.

== See also ==
- Peace Pledge Union
