= Tavistock Square =

Public square in London, England

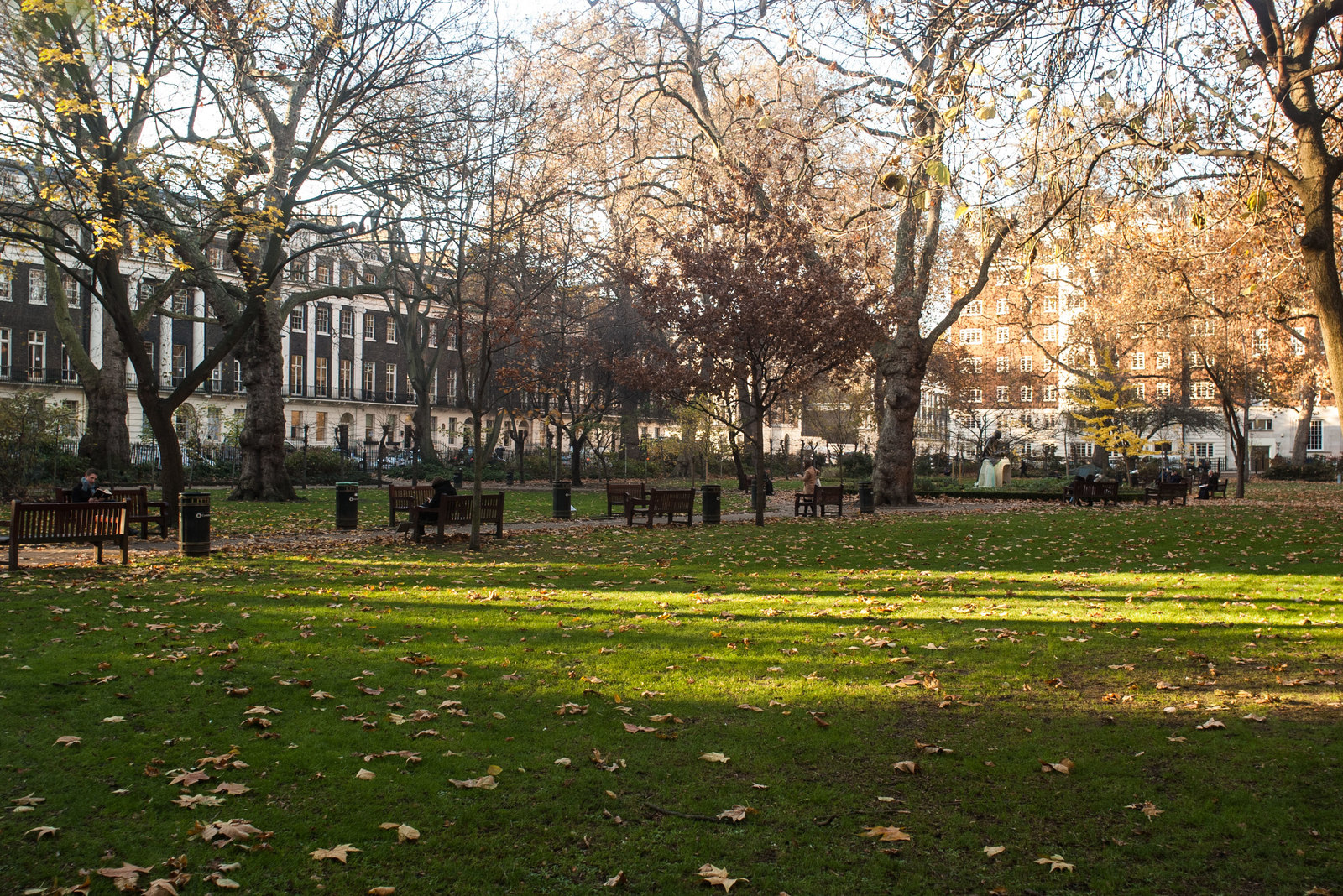
- Tavistock Square, looking north
- Interactive map of Tavistock Square
- Namesake: Marquess of Tavistock
- Location: Bloomsbury, London Borough of Camden, Inner London
- Postal code: WC1
- Coordinates: 51.5249903°N 0.1289968°W

Tavistock Square is a public square in Bloomsbury, in the London Borough of Camden near Euston Station.

== History ==
Tavistock Square was built shortly after 1806 by the property developer James Burton and the master builder Thomas Cubitt for Francis Russell, 5th Duke of Bedford, and formed part of the Bedford Estate in London, owned by the Dukes of Bedford. The square takes its name from Marquess of Tavistock, a courtesy title given to the eldest sons of the Dukes of Bedford.

In 1920 the Tavistock Clinic was founded in the square, a pioneering psychiatric clinic whose patients included shell-shock victims of the First World War. In 1946 the Tavistock Institute of Human Relations separated from the Tavistock Clinic. The Tavistock Clinic has since moved to Swiss Cottage.

Richard Lydekker, naturalist, geologist and writer of numerous books on natural history, was born at Tavistock Square in 1849.

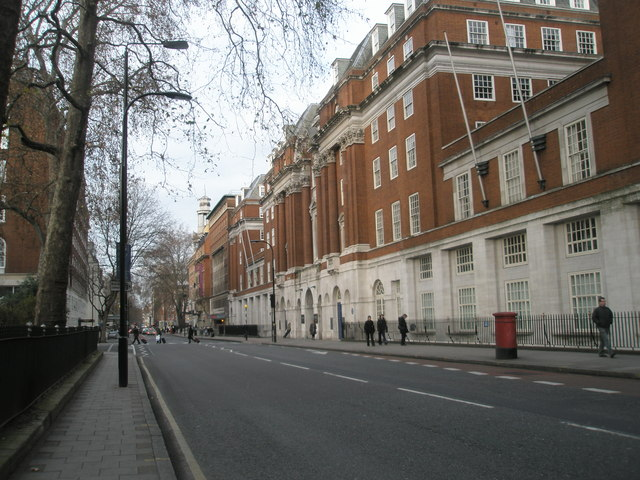
The 7 July 2005 bomb on bus number 30 exploded to the left of the red postbox in front of BMA House.

Tavistock Square was the scene of one of the four suicide bombings on 7 July 2005. The bomb was detonated by 18-year-old Hasib Hussain on a double-decker bus bearing route number 30; it had been diverted from its normal route along Euston Road because of traffic disruption by the other three bombings at tube stations. The bomb exploded immediately outside the British Medical Association building, many of whose staff came out to give what help they could. The explosion killed 13 passengers, plus Hussain himself. Many others were injured. In September 2018, a memorial honouring the victims and the efforts of those who gave assistance was unveiled in Tavistock Square Gardens, replacing a plaque that had been fixed to the railings outside BMA House, opposite to the new site.

== Public art ==
The centre-piece of the gardens is a statue of Mahatma Gandhi, sculpted by Fredda Brilliant and installed in 1968. The hollow pedestal was intended, and is used, for people to leave floral tributes to the peace campaigner and nonviolent resister to oppression in South Africa and British rule in India.

A cherry tree was planted in 1967 in memory of the victims of the atomic bombings of Hiroshima and Nagasaki.

A generation later, in 1994, the Conscientious Objectors Commemorative Stone commemorating "men and women conscientious objectors all over the world and in every age" by Hugh Court was unveiled.

These three features have led to the square unofficially being regarded by some as a peace park or garden, and annual ceremonies are held at each of these memorials.

A bust of the writer Virginia Woolf, cast from a 1931 sculpture by Stephen Tomlin (1901–1937), was unveiled in 2004 at the southwest corner of the square. Woolf lived at 52 Tavistock Square between 1924 and 1939. From there she and her husband Leonard Woolf ran the Hogarth Press, which became a prominent and influential publisher at the forefront of modernist fiction and poetry (publishing T.S. Eliot, E.M. Forster and Katherine Mansfield among others) and translating the works of Sigmund Freud into English.

The square contains the Dame Louisa Aldrich-Blake Memorial in honour of surgeon Dame Louisa Aldrich-Blake (1865 –1925), with a bust of Aldrich-Blake by Arthur George Walker on a plinth designed by Sir Edwin Lutyens.

== Buildings ==
The following buildings are on Tavistock Square:

- Tavistock House, home of James Burton while he developed the area and then of Charles Dickens, was on the east side of the square. A blue plaque on BMA House commemorates him. It was demolished in 1901.
- "BMA House", the headquarters of the British Medical Association, designed by Sir Edwin Lutyens in 1911 is on the east side (on the site previously occupied by Tavistock House) and is a grade II listed building.
- Connaught Hall, a University of London hall of residence, which was built in the early 19th century, is on the west side of the square and is a grade II listed building.
- Woburn House, on the north side of the square contains the headquarters of Universities UK, the conference of university rectors, and the headquarters of the Medical Schools Council, an organisation which represents the interests and ambitions of UK medical schools.
- The Tavistock Hotel, a branch of Imperial London Hotels, completed in 1951 is on the south side of the square.
- Lynton House and Tavis House, both substantial red-brick office blocks on the east side, were built in the mid-20th century.
- Passfield Hall, a hall of residence for undergraduates of the London School of Economics.

== Gallery ==
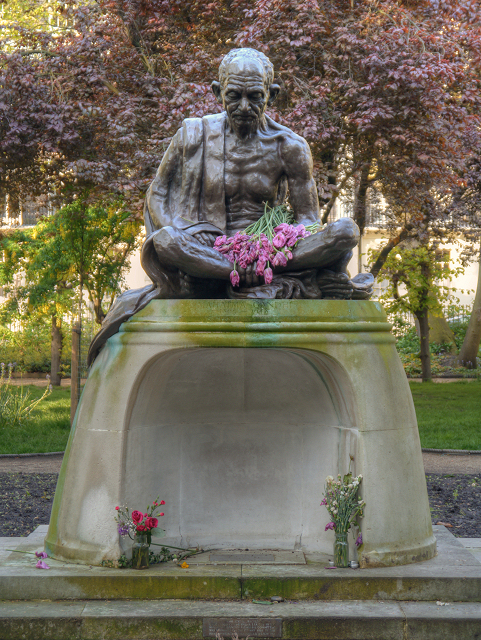
Statue of Mahatma Gandhi in the centre of the square

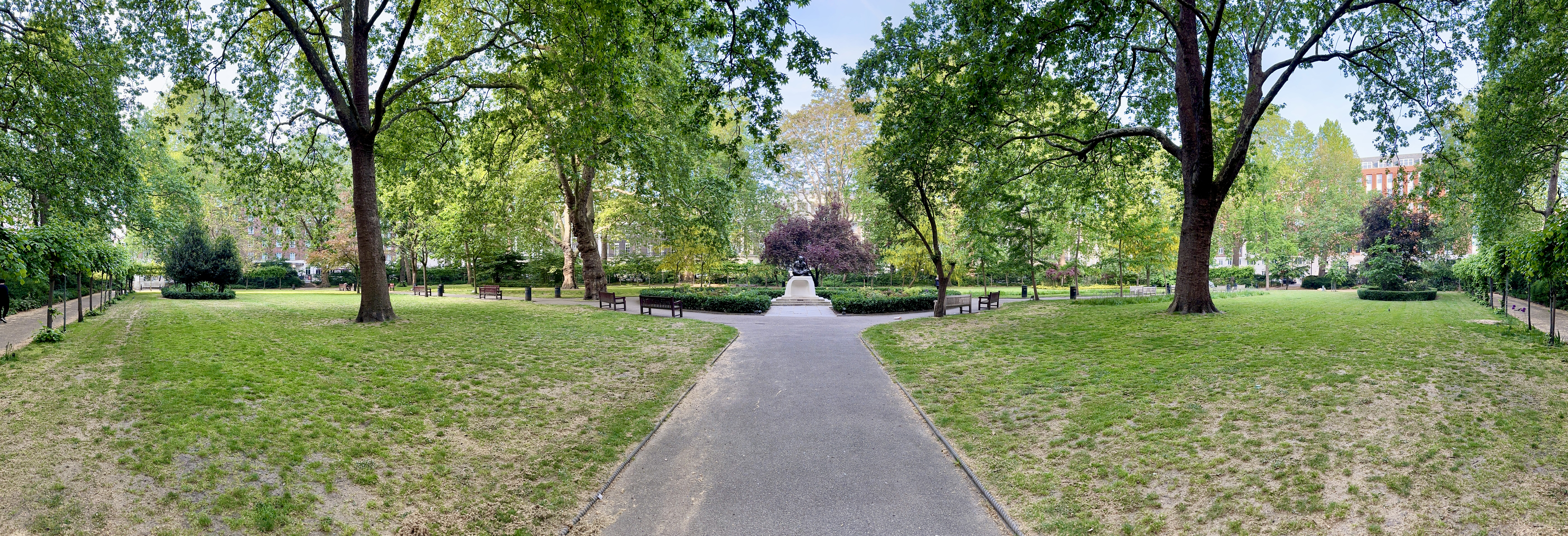
Panoramic photo of the square

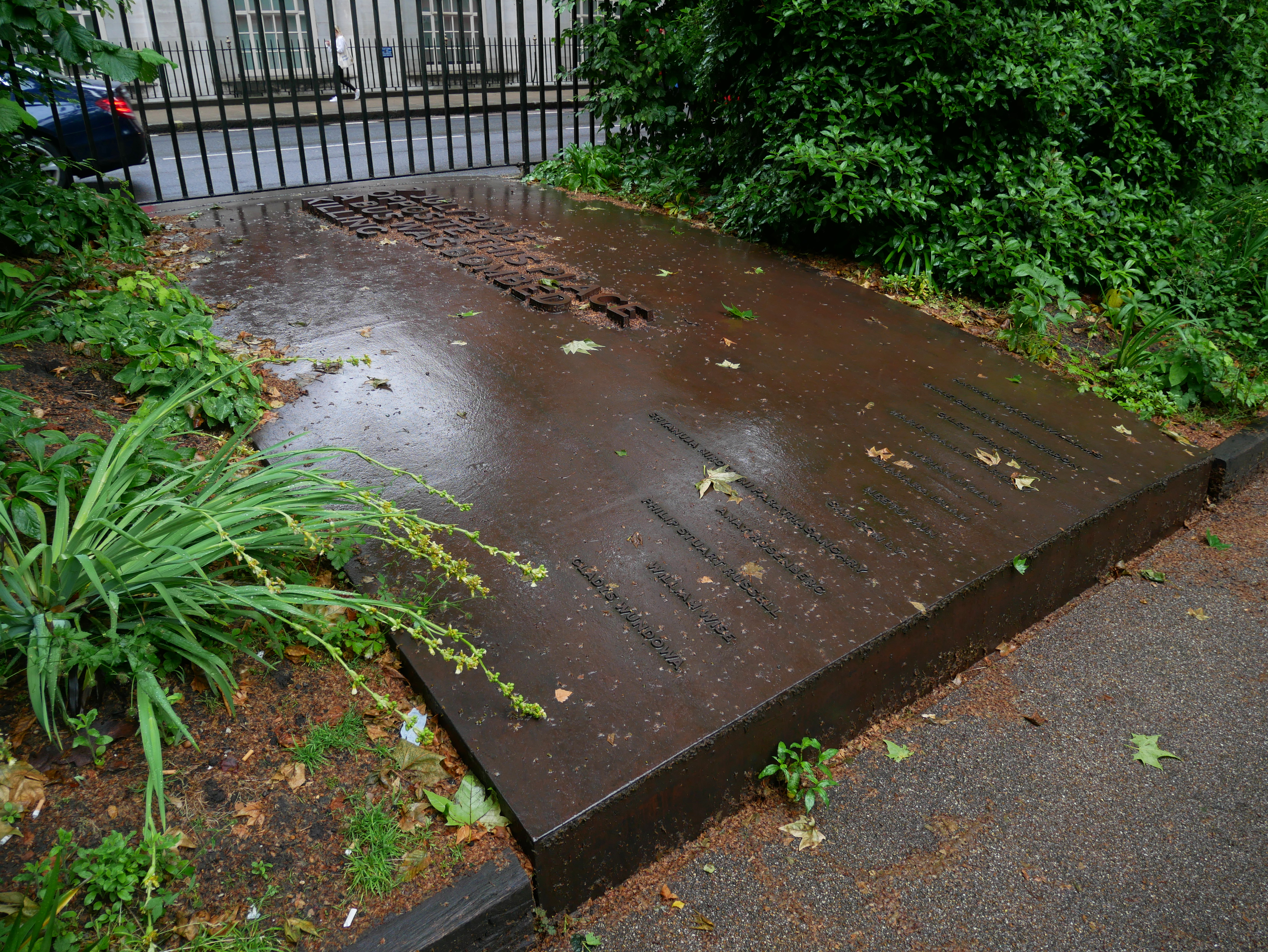
7 July Memorial

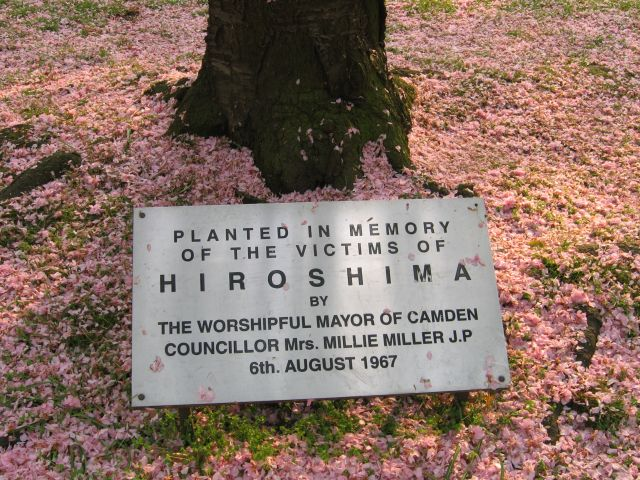
Plaque at the base of the Hiroshima cherry tree amid fallen blossoms

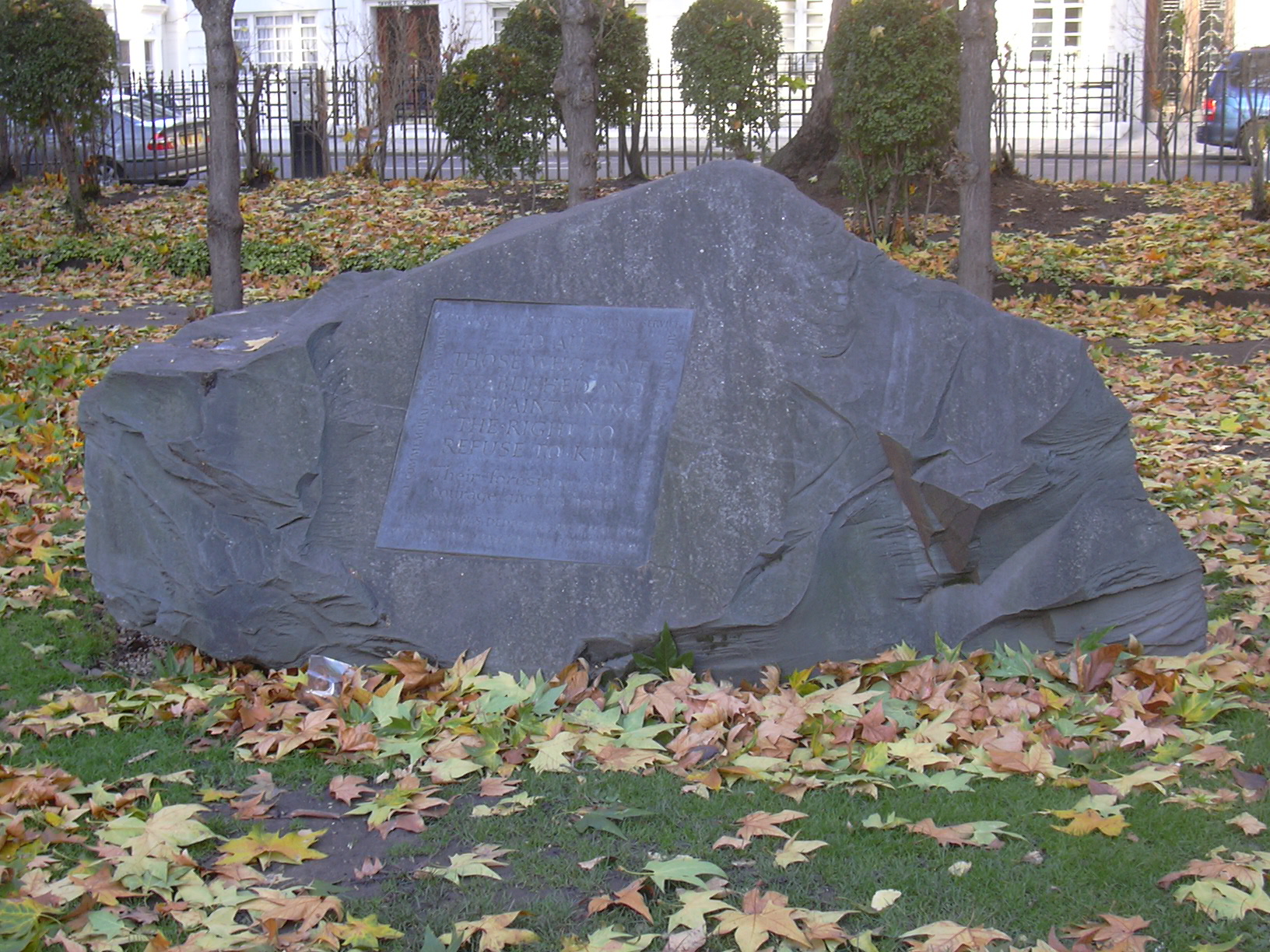
Conscientious Objectors Commemorative Stone, on the north side of the square

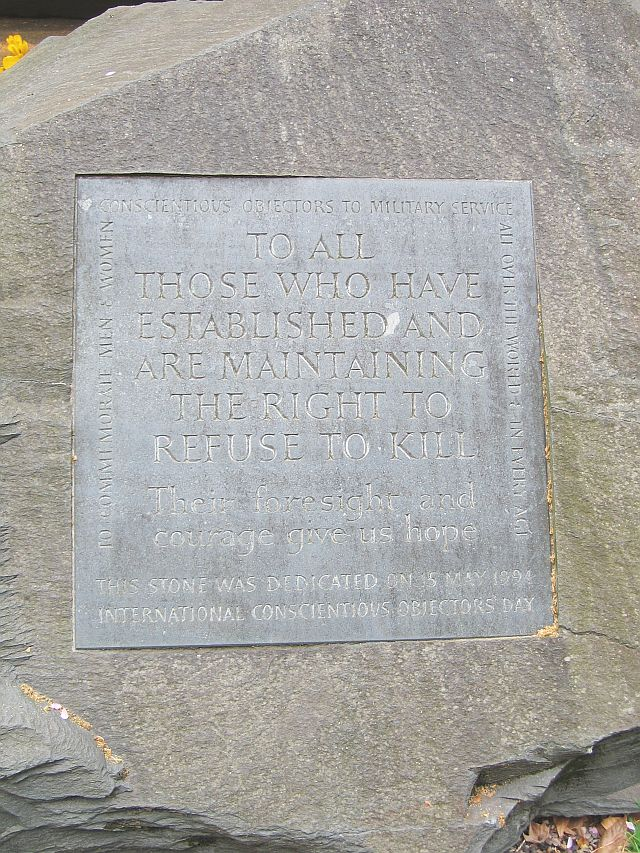
Conscientious Objectors Stone inscription

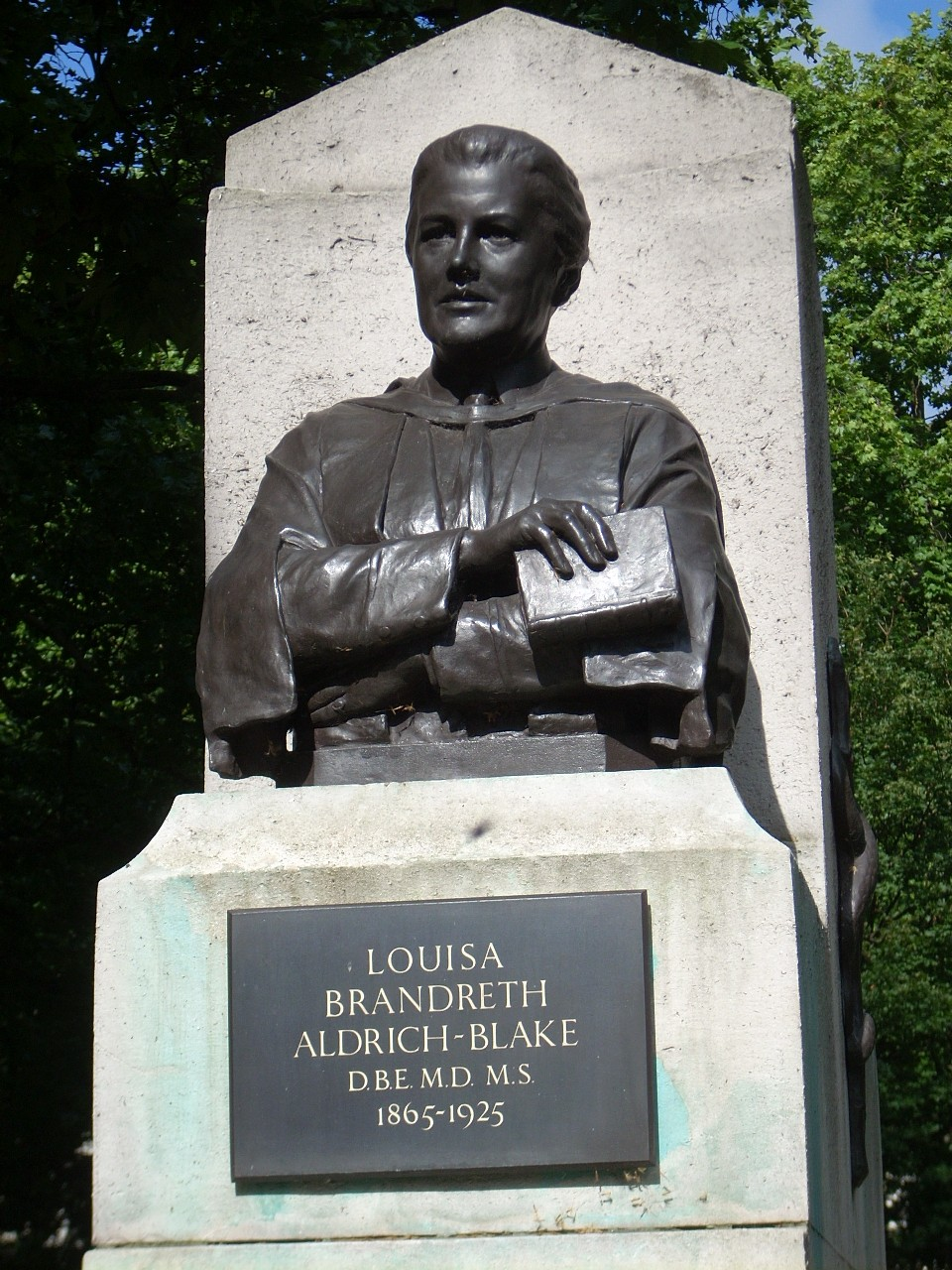
Dame Louisa Aldrich-Blake Memorial

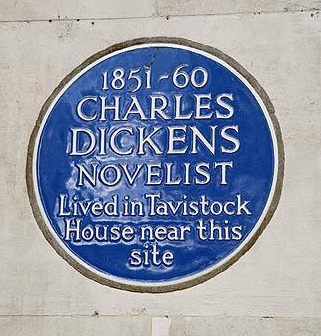
Blue plaque on BMA House commemorating Dickens and Tavistock House

== See also ==
- List of eponymous roads in London
- Bedford Square
- Russell Square
- Bloomsbury Square
- Gordon Square
- Torrington Square
- Woburn Square
