= Simon Lack =

Scottish actor (1913–1980)

- in The Avengers: False Witness (1968)
- Born: Alexander MacAlpine; 19 December 1913; Cleland, Lanarkshire, Scotland, UK
- Died: 8 August 1980 (aged 66); London, England, UK
- Occupation: Actor

Simon Lack (19 December 1913 – 8 August 1980) was a Scottish actor.

He was born Alexander MacAlpine in Cleland, North Lanarkshire, Scotland. Known locally as Alec, he was the youngest child and only son of his father, Alexander McAlpine (known as Sandy) and his mother, Euphemia Ritchie. His sisters were Charlotte (Lottie), Mary, Euphemia (Euphie), Agnes (Nan), and Jenny. Another sister, Jessie, died in childhood. Sandy MacAlpine was a stonemason but worked down the mines when there was no masonry work available, making Simon Lack's later role in Proud Valley particularly poignant to those who knew him from his youth. Euphemia Ritchie's family were somewhat wealthier, but she was disowned on account of her choice of husband, and the family lived for many years in a one-room flat (known in Scottish working class language as a 'single end'), although it seems eventually one of her uncles relented and came to their aid. Alec's earliest ventures into acting were in local theatres. He lost five years during the Second World War and served in the European theatre and was present at Monte Cassino. After the war he returned to acting, getting back into stage work.

He was also a member of the BBC Radio company during the late 1950s/early 1960s, and notably guest-starred in all but two of the Paul Temple serials (mysteries) that starred Peter Coke and Marjorie Westbury. His television roles included two Doctor Who serials; The Mind of Evil (1971) and The Androids of Tara (1978). He also guest-starred in episodes of The Saint, Jason King, and Doomwatch. He had co-starring roles in Telford's Change, Enemy at the Door and The Borgias. He also portrayed Odysseus in the Encyclopedia Britannica educational film series, released in 1965. These films are now available on YouTube.

== Filmography ==
Year	Title	Role	Notes
1938	They Drive by Night	Roy Allen – brother of man to be executed	
1939	Goodbye, Mr. Chips	Wainwright	Uncredited
1939	Sons of the Sea	Philip Hyde	
1940	The Proud Valley	Emlyn Parry	
1940	Just William	Robert Brown	
1947	The Silver Darlings	Don	
1948	Bonnie Prince Charlie	Young Alan of Moidart	
1956	Port of Escape	Reporter	Uncredited
1960	Clue of the Twisted Candle	Jock	
1960	Cone of Silence	Navigator #1	
1961	On the Fiddle	Fl / Lt Baldwin	
1961	The Court Martial of Major Keller	Wilson	
1962	The Durant Affair	Roland Farley	
1962	The Longest Day	Air Chief Marshal Sir Trafford Leigh-Mallory	Uncredited
1963	Dr. Syn, Alias the Scarecrow	Dragoon Corporal	
1969	Battle of Britain	RAF Officer	Uncredited
1969	Night After Night After Night	Endell's Q.C.	
1969	The Bushbaby	First Officer	
1970	Trog	Colonel Vickers	
1971	All at Sea	Mr Parker	
1980	Love in a Cold Climate	Doctor	
