= Tinker (film) =

1949 British film by Herbert Marshall

- Directed by: Herbert Marshall
- Screenplay by: Herbert Marshall
- Produced by: Herbert Marshall; Fredda Brilliant
- Starring: Derek Smith
- Cinematography: Gunther Krampf; G. Lankford
- Edited by: Herbert Marshall
- Music by: Leonard Rafter
- Production company: Citizen FIlms
- Distributed by: Eros Films
- Release date: 1949
- Running time: 69 minutes
- Country: United Kingdom
- Language: English

Tinker is a 1949 British drama-documentary second feature ('B') film directed and written by Herbert Marshall and starring Derek Smith. It was produced by Marshall and Fredda Brilliant for Citizen Films and distributed by Eros Films.

The following statement appears after the opening credits:

"This film has no stars. Unknown people largely play their real life parts in their real surroundings. It is to them and their various organisations that the producers of this film wish to make grateful acknowledgment."

== Plot ==
Tinker is a young gypsy boy who runs aways from the slums to join mining trainees at a coal industry residential training centre in County Durham. There he is taught to read and write. When wrongly suspected of theft, he runs away and hides in a spoil dumping conveyor which tips him into the sea. His pals rescue him and he returns to the centre.

== Cast ==
- Derek Smith as Tinker

== Production ==
The film was commissioned by the National Coal Board and shot in the Durham mining village of Easington.

== Reception ==
The Monthly Film Bulletin wrote: "There are no professional actors, no studio scenes; an experienced cameraman does well under exacting conditions. Due to the circumstances of its making, and the natural playing of the boy, the film has a certain freshness and un evident honesty of intention, There is, unfortunately, considerable ineptitude in the writing and handling, and one has to applaud motives rather than results."

Kine Weekly wrote: "The detail is obviously authentic and the leading characters, actually played by budding miners, are quite natural, but somehow or other it lacks the professional touch and fails fully to live up to Edinburgh Festival eulogies. Well-meaning, but artless quota, mainly for the unsophisticated. ... The unnamed boy who plays Tinker seems extremely young for the part, but he, nevertheless, gives a sound and engaging performance. The other boys are also good, but they, too, fail to figure in the list of credits. ... Happily, the acting is better than the direction and the keen performances of the youngsters account for some lively, if ingenuous, surface action. In fairness, they should be allowed to take a bow."

Picture Show wrote: "There are no professional actors in the cast of this film, which was made at a Residential Centre where young miners are trained – trainees themselves and their mothers and fathers played their real-life roles. It is a semi-documentary film, with the role of the gipsy boy, Tinker, round whose trials and triumphs during his period of training the film revolves, played by Derek Smith, a youngster discovered by the director in an East End boys' club."

Tribune wrote: "Socially and morally, it is unexceptionable – too much so, perhaps, for conviction as a study of the human boy. But, no doubt partly because of unavoidable economy in production, it seems a callow effort."

TV Guide wrote: "Interesting detail, despite contrivances."

In British Sound Films: The Studio Years 1928–1959 David Quinlan rated the film as "mediocre", writing, after describing the plot: "Well-intentioned and -photographed, film hasn't much more to offer."

== Accolades ==
The film won an award at the 1949 Edinburgh Film Festival.

== Home media ==
The film was released on DVD by Renown Pictures in 2014.
