= Louisa Aldrich-Blake =

Surgeon and medical school dean

Dame Louisa Aldrich-Blake DBE
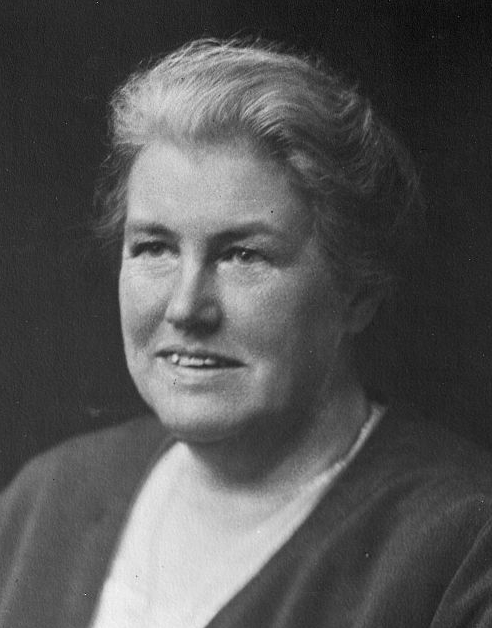
- Born: Louisa Brandreth Aldrich-Blake; 15 August 1865; Chingford, Essex, England
- Died: 28 December 1925 (aged 60); Welsh Bicknor, Herefordshire, England
- Occupation: Surgeon

Dame Louisa Brandreth Aldrich-Blake DBE (15 August 1865 – 28 December 1925) was a pioneering surgeon and one of the first British women to enter the world of modern medicine.

Born in Chingford, Essex, she was the eldest daughter of a curate. Louisa Aldrich-Blake graduated in medicine from the Royal Free Hospital in 1893. She was the first British woman to obtain a Master of Surgery degree and was a lead surgeon by 1910. She volunteered for military medical service during the First World War. She was one of the first people to perform surgery on rectal and cervical cancers. In recognition of her commitment and achievements, a statue of her was erected in Tavistock Square, London. This statue's position is close to her alma mater.

== Early life and education ==
Louisa Aldrich-Blake was born in Chingford, Essex (now the London Borough of Waltham Forest) to Rev Frederick James Aldrich-Blake and his wife Louisa Blake Morrison. She moved with her family to Welsh Bicknor in Herefordshire during her childhood, and maintained a home in the town until her death. Throughout her career, Aldrich-Blake was associated with the Elizabeth Garrett Anderson Hospital, becoming senior surgeon in 1910.

Aldrich-Blake began her school education at Cheltenham Ladies' College. She graduated with first-class honours from the London School of Medicine for Women by 1894 as a Bachelor of Surgery, Bachelor of Medicine and an MD. Upon graduating from the University of London, Aldrich-Blake followed with a masters in surgery a year later. She went on to take the University of London's higher degrees in Medicine and Surgery, becoming the first British woman to obtain the degree of Master of Surgery.

== Career ==
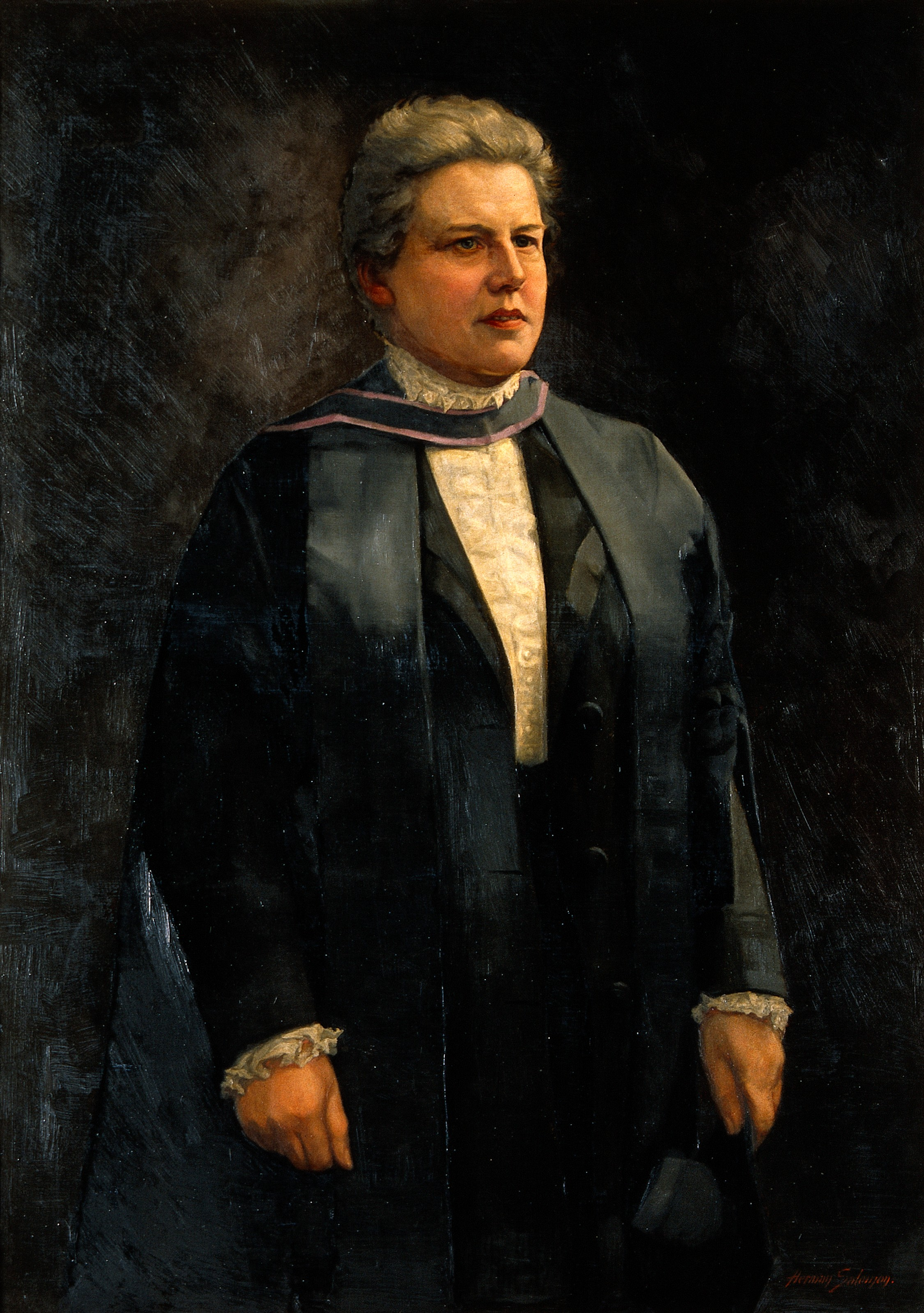
Louisa Brandreth Aldrich-Blake, portrait by Harry Herman Salomon commissioned by Henry Wellcome.

The newly qualified Aldrich-Blake began work at the New Hospital for Women and Children in London. She worked her way up to become the lead surgeon while also working at the city's Royal Free Hospital. At the Royal Free Hospital, she was the first woman to hold the post of surgical registrar in 1895 and also acted as an anaesthetist. Her position as consulting surgeon at the Royal Free started in 1919 and ended when she died in 1925. She also worked at the Canning Town Women's Settlement Hospital.

During the First World War, many of the male surgical staff were deployed on foreign active service and Dr. Aldrich-Blake took on increased responsibility for the surgery, becoming consulting surgeon to the hospital. Aldrich-Blake spent multiple holidays aiding the military hospitals in 1914 to 1916, specifically in France with Dr. Frances Ivens from the Anglo-French Red Cross Hospital and helped out as a visiting surgeon at the Women's Army Auxiliary Corps Hospital. Aldrich-Blake was nicknamed "Madame la Générale" by her patients. Her time was also spent contacting other women in the profession to organise volunteer units. She approached every woman on the Medical Register to ask if they would consider volunteering for the Royal Army Medical Corps, and 48 enrolled, many of whom were sent to Malta.

Aldrich-Blake was the first to perform operations for cervical and rectal cancers. She led the British surgeons in taking on the Wertheim operation for carcinoma of the cervix. She added a piece to the Practitioner's Encyclopedia of Midwifery and Diseases of Women named "Pain as a symptom of pelvic trouble" and a piece on "Abdomino-perineal excision of the rectum by a new method" in the British Medical Journal in 1903. She held a chair position as a vice-president of the Section of Obstetrics and Gynaecology in 1924 that was a part of the British Medical Association.

=== Academia ===
Aldrich-Blake was devoted to training students at her alma mater, the London School of Medicine for Women (now the medical school of University College London). She became Vice-Dean in 1906 and Dean of the School in 1914. Aldrich-Blake's encouragement for women to join the medical field increased the school's population by almost double during the First World War.

== Death and legacy ==
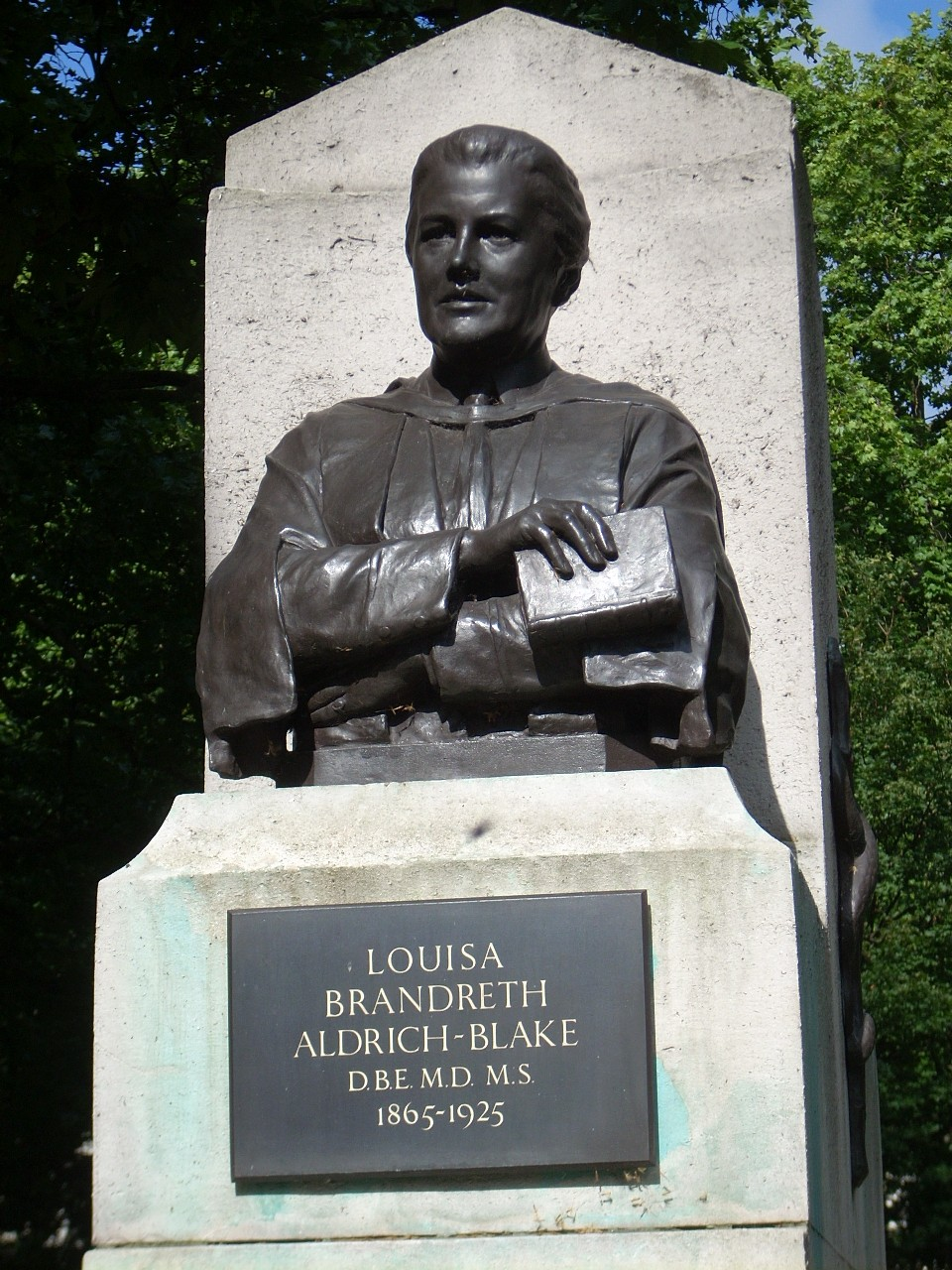
Dame Louisa Aldrich-Blake Memorial in Tavistock Square Gardens, London

Aldrich-Blake died on 28 December 1925, aged 60, from cancer at home in Welsh Bicknor, having undergone several operations during previous weeks. St Pancras Church in London celebrated her life on 1 January 1926 and her ashes were transferred back to her home.

The Dame Louisa Brandreth Aldrich-Blake Collection is located in the Royal Free Hospital's Archives Centre. The Dame Louisa Aldrich-Blake Memorial, installed in 1926, is located in Tavistock Square, London.

Her career was highlighted in a 2015 exhibit specifically related to her actions in the First World War where she performed surgery on the front line and encouraged other women to join the field. She also influenced the War Office to allow women to enlist to be a part of the medical staff.

In 2019, she was acknowledged with a Google Doodle for the UK, Ireland, Canada, Australia, New Zealand, Israel, Bulgaria, Sweden, Denmark, Estonia, and Iceland on the 154th anniversary of her birth.

== Honours ==
A year before her death, Aldrich-Blake was appointed Dame Commander of the Order of the British Empire (DBE) in the 1925 New Year Honours.
