= Lionel Britton =

British writer (1887–1971)

Lionel Erskine Nimmo Britton (4 November 1887 – 9 January 1971) was a British working-class author.

== Biography ==
Lionel Britton was born at Astwood Bank, on the borders of Warwickshire and Worcestershire. His father was a solicitor in the village, although the practice collapsed the year after Lionel's birth. Following the death of his father six years later, Lionel and his siblings went to live with their grandparents in Redditch.

Britton claimed that the National school he briefly attended in Redditch called him 'too advanced', so he educated himself for a while at his grandfather's house in Hewell Road, before escaping from the family. After existing in Birmingham for a week on just a loaf of bread, he left for London, where his first job was as an errand-boy in a greengrocer's shop, and later in an educational bookshop connected with the University Tutorial College, where one of his literary heroes, H. G. Wells, was once a tutor. He later claimed that his universities were, as he termed them, 'the penny dumps on the secondhand book-barrows' in Farringdon Road and around the British Museum, and that his finishing school was Speakers' Corner at Marble Arch in Hyde Park.

A conscientious objector during the First World War, Britton was imprisoned for a year, and, according to some autobiographical notes by his friend Erik Warman, 'he was a difficult prisoner and refused to do any work or take any exercise'. Britton nevertheless managed to find work after his imprisonment, for about six years with the Incorporated Society of British Advertisers, the final two as Assistant General Secretary. At the time, Britton had been working on Hunger and Love, the only novel of his ever published, for some years. It is a huge digressive book about the intellectual life and grinding poverty of a teenage bookshop assistant; Bertrand Russell was so impressed with the novel that he wrote a five-page Introduction to it. By the time the novel came out in 1931, Britton had already made the headlines with his first published play, Brain, which received such considerable attention because of Bernard Shaw's generally favourable comments about it.

As early as 1917, Britton had started to learn Russian, and even applied a little later for citizenship of that country, although his application was disallowed for reasons unknown. He had another play published – Spacetime Inn (1932) – but waited until his third play, Animal Ideas, was published very shortly before his long projected visit to Russia in 1935. He stayed there at the expense of the International Union of Revolutionary Writers, but the visit was a great disappointment for him: he hated the queues, what he considered to be the ignorance of the Russian people, and the fact that they would not answer his questions or allow him to walk around freely. Above all, perhaps, he thought that his belief in co-operation as opposed to competition was not being carried out in Russia: he believed that the shortages of almost everything were caused by the government funnelling money into defence. He stayed for three months, and then took the boat back.

For several months, Britton remained incommunicado. He had awoken from his utopian dream of Russia to find an only too real nightmare both abroad and at home. Putnam, having made only a modest profit from Hunger and Love and losses with Brain and Spacetime Inn, had already refused to give more than a perfunctory promotion to Animal Ideas. It bombed. He was facing ruin as a writer.

Britton escaped to Hastings, a place with literary working-class associations: the town was the setting of Robert Tressell's The Ragged Trousered Philanthropists (1914). There, Britton worked at Netherwood, a large, run-down property bought by the actor and playwright E. C. Vernon Symonds to convert into a left-wing haven for meetings, trade union conferences, or simply as a guest house. Britton received free board and lodging in return for manual work. He hated almost everything about the house. Now demolished, the building is generally only remembered as the last resting place of Aleister Crowley.

He wrote more plays and one novel, philosophical works, and dramatised versions of novels by Dickens, Trollope and J. Jefferson Farjeon. But apart from two translations of rather obscure Russian writers in the 1940s, nothing else of Britton's was published.

On Britton's writing, his friend Herbert Marshall explains: 'He would not allow a single comma to be altered from his original text, so eventually quarrelled with his publishers who refused to publish the vast, lengthy works without some editing'.

Britton spent his last three years as a virtual recluse in Margate and died in 1971 at the local hospital following a heart attack aged 83. Marshall, then Professor and Director of Soviet and East European Studies (Performing Arts) at Southern Illinois University, had all Britton's literary effects transported to the university, where they remain.

== Bibliography ==
Novel

- Hunger and Love (1931), with an Introduction by Bertrand Russell

Plays

- Brain (1930)
- Spacetime Inn (1932)
- Animal Ideas (1935)

== Secondary literature ==
- The Work of Lionel Britton (PhD, 2007) by Tony Shaw
