= St. Louis Literary Award =

Annual American fiction award

The St. Louis Literary Award has been presented yearly since 1967 to a distinguished figure in literature. It is sponsored by the Saint Louis University Library Associates.

== Winners ==
Past Recipients of the Award:

- 2026 Jhumpa Lahiri
- 2025 Colson Whitehead
- 2024 Jamaica Kincaid
- 2023 Neil Gaiman
- 2022 Arundhati Roy
- 2021 Zadie Smith
- 2020 Michael Chabon
- 2019 Edwidge Danticat
- 2018 Stephen Sondheim
- 2017 Margaret Atwood
- 2016 Michael Ondaatje
- 2015 David Grossman
- 2014 Jeanette Winterson
- 2013 [no award]
- 2012 Tony Kushner
- 2011 Mario Vargas Llosa
- 2010 Don DeLillo
- 2009 Sir Salman Rushdie
- 2008 E. L. Doctorow
- 2007 William H. Gass
- 2006 Michael Frayn
- 2005 Richard Ford
- 2004 Garry Wills
- 2003 Margaret Drabble
- 2002 Joan Didion
- 2001 Simon Schama
- 2000 N. Scott Momaday
- 1999 Chinua Achebe
- 1998 Seamus Heaney
- 1997 Stephen E. Ambrose
- 1996 Antonia Fraser
- 1995 Edward Albee
- 1994 Stephen Jay Gould
- 1993 David McCullough
- 1992 Shelby Foote
- 1991 August Wilson
- 1990 Tom Wolfe
- 1989 Richard Wilbur
- 1988 Joyce Carol Oates
- 1987 John Updike
- 1986 Saul Bellow
- 1985 Walker Percy
- 1984 [no award]
- 1983 Eudora Welty
- 1982 William Styron
- 1981 James A. Michener
- 1980 Arthur Miller
- 1979 Howard Nemerov
- 1978 Mortimer J. Adler
- 1977 Robert Penn Warren
- 1976 R. Buckminster Fuller
- 1975 John Hope Franklin
- 1974 Tennessee Williams
- 1973 James T. Farrell
- 1972 Francis Warner
- 1971 Barbara Tuchman
- 1970 W. H. Auden
- 1969 George Plimpton
- 1968 Jacques Barzun
- 1967 Henry Steele Commager
