= Statue of Mahatma Gandhi, Tavistock Square =

Sculpture by Fredda Brilliant in Bloomsbury, London

Statue of Mahatma Gandhi
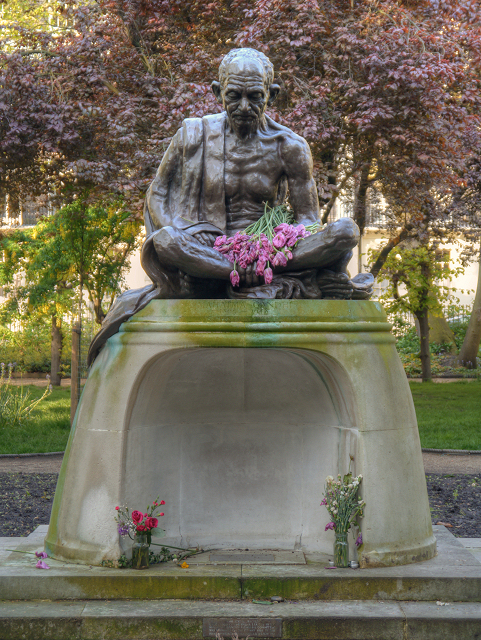
- The statue in 2012
- Artist: Fredda Brilliant
- Year: 1968
- Medium: Bronze
- Subject: Mahatma Gandhi
- Designation: Grade II listed building
- Location: Tavistock Square; 51.52504°N 0.12904°W

A bronze statue of Mahatma Gandhi by Fredda Brilliant was unveiled in 1968 at the centre of Tavistock Square in London, to mark the impending centenary of Gandhi's birth in 1869. Mahatma Gandhi had studied law at University College London nearby from 1888 to 1891, before being called to the bar at the Inner Temple.

== Description ==
The statue portrays Gandhi in his later years, sitting in a contemplative pose, with legs crossed in the lotus position and his left hand resting on his ankles, and his bare head with furrowed brows slightly lowered. He is wearing his characteristic dhoti loincloth, with a shawl over the right shoulder. The statue is mounted on a rounded Portland stone plinth, which stands on a square platform with four steps. The plinth bears the inscription "Mahatma Gandhi, 1869–1948". A large alcove hollowed out at the front of the plinth can house tributes, such as flowers or candles. A small plaque was added in 1996, to commemorate the 125th anniversary of Gandhi's birth two years earlier.

The Gandhi memorial was erected by the Mahatma Gandhi Memorial Committee, with the support and guidance of the India League. It was unveiled by the British Prime Minister Harold Wilson on 17 May 1968, in the presence of the first High Commissioner of India to the UK after independence, V. K. Krishna Menon, and the then-current High Commissioner of India to the United Kingdom, Shanti Swaroop Dhavan. It became a Grade II listed building in 1974.

Nearby in Tavistock Square is the 7 July Memorial installed in 2018, the Conscientious Objectors Commemorative Stone installed in 1994, a cherry tree planted in 1967 in memory of the victims of the bombing of Hiroshima and Nagasaki, and the Dame Louisa Aldrich-Blake Memorial erected in 1926.

== Maquettes ==
A large bronze maquette of the statue was shown on the BBC television programme Antiques Roadshow in April 2013, valued by Philip Mould at £20,000. The heirs of Fredda Brilliant auctioned this 94.5 cm (37.2 in) high maquette, signed and dated 1964, at Woolley & Wallis in Salisbury as part of a sale of works from the artist's studio. Given an auctioneer's estimate of £800 to £1,200, the maquette was sold on 5 June 2019 for £52,000. The sale also included a 93 cm (37 in) high plaster version, sold for £13,000, and a 28 cm (11 in) high resin version in a lot of two sculptures of Gandhi for £5,000. A 27 cm (11 in) high bronze version of the statue had been sold at auction in London in 2014 for £580.

== See also ==
- List of artistic depictions of Mahatma Gandhi
