= Arthur George Walker =

English sculptor and painter (1861–1939)

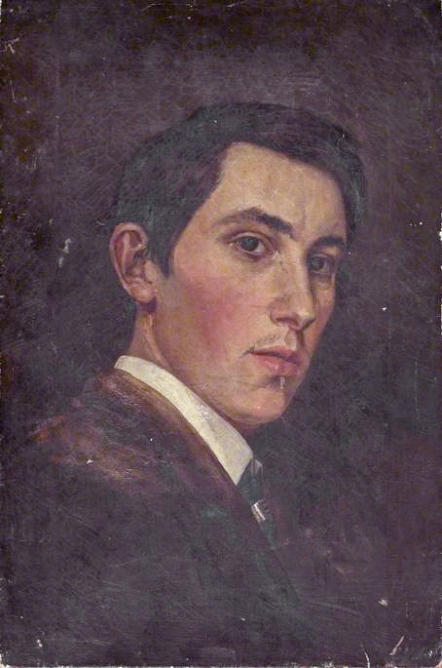
- Self portrait
- Born: 20 October 1861; Hackney, London, England
- Died: September 13, 1939 (aged 77); England
- Known for: Sculpture, relief, illustration

Arthur George Walker RA (20 October 1861 – 13 September 1939) was an English sculptor and painter. Among his best-known works are several war memorials and the statue of Florence Nightingale in Waterloo Place, London.

== Personal life ==
Arthur George Walker was born 20 October 1861 to Robert Walker and his wife in Hackney, London. Robert Walker was a ship owner and surveyor. Until 1911, Walker lived with his Aunt Isabella and two siblings, Emily and Harold. He studied at the Royal Academy from about 1883 to 1887 and during this time won various prizes. He died aged 77 on 13 September 1939 in England.

== Works ==
=== War memorials ===
Work	Location	Image	Notes and References
Heath Town War Memorial	Heath Town, Wolverhampton		This memorial, situated in the centre of Heath Town Park, has a bronze sculpture by Walker depicting a soldier and some relief panels on the side of the memorial's pedestal. One of the relief panels shows an aeroplane taking off and the other depicts a naval scene. The bronze casting work involved was carried out by the G.Fiorini Foundry.
Ironbridge War Memorial	Ironbridge, Shropshire		The Ironbridge War Memorial is located close to the famous Ironbridge and features a life size sculpture of a soldier in full marching order. The soldier stands on a pedestal. There are three plaques attached to the memorial. One is inscribed "IN GRATEFUL / AND UNDYING MEMORY / OF THE VALIANT MEN / OF IRON BRIDGE / WHO LAID DOWN / THEIR LIVES / IN THE GREAT WAR/ 1914 – 1919 / WE THANK OUR GOD UPON / EVERY REMEMBRANCE OF YOU" the second lists the names of those 53 Ironbridge men lost in the Great War and the third is inscribed " THE CHURCH CLOCK WAS / ILLUMINATED AS A MEMORIAL / TO THE FOLLOWING MEN OF / IRONBRIDGE WHO LOST THEIR LIVES DURING THE 1939–1945 WAR. / (10 names)" The memorial was unveiled on 8 March 1924 by Col.A.N.B.Garrett.
Heston War Memorial	Heston, Middlesex		Heston War Memorial stands in a garden at a junction of the Heston Road. It remembers the dead of both World Wars and comprises a York stone pedestal with a Portland stone sculpture of a soldier leaning on his rifle which is reversed. There are relief panels on two sides of the pedestal. 99 Heston men lost in the First World War are remembered and their names listed. Those lost in the Second World War are not listed. The memorial was unveiled on 1 June 1918 by a Mrs Becker.
Bury St Edmunds. South African War Memorial	Bury St Edmunds, Suffolk		This memorial is inscribed "VULNERATUS NON VICTUS / THIS MONUMENT / WAS ERECTED BY SUFFOLK PEOPLE AS A MEMORIAL / TO SUFFOLK SOLDIERS WHO LOST THEIR LIVES IN THE / SOUTH AFRICAN WAR / 1899–1902" and has a bronze depiction of a soldier leaning on a rock as well as the coat of arms of the West Suffolk County Council. The soldier is bare-headed. A total of 193 Suffolk men who died in the Boer War are remembered. The unveiling took place on 12 November 1904. Walker was assisted by the mason Mr.A.H.Hanchet.
Old Salopians Memorial	Shrewsbury School, Shropshire		This memorial is located in the apex of the angle in the Central Avenue which leads to the school's front gates and the school itself. It lists those boys of Shrewsbury School who died in the two World Wars. It comprises a Portland stone plinth upon which is a pedestal surmounted by a bronze statue of Sir Philip Sidney. There are also two relief panels one of which depicts a scene in the trenches and the other depicts Sir Philip's death at the Battle of Zutphen. The memorial also bears the school's coat of arms. The memorial gives the names of those who gave their lives in the 1914–1918 war, a total of 322 men in all and another 259 names of those men lost in the 1939–1945 conflict. The memorial was unveiled on 24 May 1923 by Lt Gen Sir Harold Bridgwood Walker. General Sir Bernard Paget was present in 1948 when the names of those lost in the 1939–1945 conflict were unveiled. Walker carried out the sculptural work, and the bronze casting was carried out by A.B.Burton at the Thames Ditton Foundry.
The Memorial to the 6th Battalion Gordon Highlanders	Keith, Moray		This memorial stands in a memorial garden in Keith's Main Road. The inscription reads "6TH (BANFFSHIRE & DONSIDE) BATTALION OF THE GORDON HIGHLANDERS" and a depiction of a Gordon Highlander in kilt and bonnet and with rifle raised at the ready stands on a large plinth. The plinth is of sandstone and the Highlander is in bronze. The battalion depot was based in Keith, hence the choice of location.
Derby War Memorial	Derby		The memorial is located in Derby's Cathedral Quarter and on the south side of Market Place near to the Guidhall entrance. The memorial honours the dead of the two World Wars and dates to 1924. The Cross, pedestal and base are all of sandstone and Walker's sculpture is of bronze as are the plaques. The whole memorial comprises a sandstone ashlar monument with a cross on a pedestal all on a three-stepped base. The bronze figure of a mother and child features in the centre of the memorial. The original unveiling took place on 11 November 1924 and there was a re-dedication in 1994. The architect was Charles Clayton Thompson and the bronze casting was by A.B.Burton. Walker's sculpture is often assumed to represent the Virgin Mary and Baby Jesus but the notes in the unveiling ceremony programme refer to it as "... a typical English mother [and] her son ...".
Bassingbourn and Kneesworth War Memorial	Bassingbourn cum Kneesworth, Cambridgeshire		This memorial stands at the junction of the High Street and North End and consists of a three-stepped square base surmounted by a double plinth, tapered shaft and Celtic cross with an inscription on the faces of the upper plinth. A laurel wreath is carved in relief on the front face of the upper plinth. The memorial stands in the centre of an enclosure formed by four low red brick walls. Walker designed the memorial and did whatever carving was involved. This village lost 42 men in the 1914–1918 war and another 11 in the 1939–1945 conflict. The unveiling took place on 22 May 1921.
Memorial in St Werburgh's Church	Derby		St Werburgh's has a wall-mounted cast-bronze figure of Christ with His arms outstretched surmounting a plaque. The bow fronted plaque has a relief at the head with six wings surrounding a cherub's face and a Latin cross at the centre with names in raised upright lettering in two columns. The inscription reads "Remember 1914–1918 / (Names) / Blessed are the Peacemakers" A total of 47 men are listed.
Limehouse War Memorial	Commercial Road, Limehouse, Greater London		In St Anne in the East Church, this memorial carries the inscription "TO THE GLORY OF / GOD / AND IN GRATEFUL MEMORY OF THE MEN OF LIMEHOUSE WHO FELL IN / THE GREAT WAR 1914–1918 / GREATER LOVE HATH NO MAN THAN THIS THAT A MAN LAY DOWN HIS LIFE FOR HIS FRIENDS / OF ANY NAMES NOT ENGRAVED IN PERISHABLE STONE / GOD HOLDS ETERNAL RECORD IN HIS HEART ALONE" The memorial comprises a bronze figure of Jesus Christ and a relief panel depicting a scene in the trenches (a duplicate of that on the Old Salopians Memorial). 458 Limehouse men are remembered. The memorial was unveiled on 28 May 1921 by General The Lord Byng of Vimy.
Dartford War Memorial	Dartford, Kent		A bronze statue of a British Tommy on a stepped granite pedestal with inscribed bronze plaques. Commemorates the First and Second World Wars and the Korean War. Walker was selected after the Dartford War Memorial Committee saw his memorial in Sevenoaks which uses the same "British Tommy" figure. It is written that the sculptor sketched his design for the Tommy from life; the model was a soldier, recently returned from Flanders with whom the artist corresponded on his return to the trenches. According to Walker the man survived to see photographs of the finished statue. The founders A.B.Burton carried out the bronze casting.
Sevenoaks War Memorial	Sevenoaks, Kent		This memorial has the sculpture of the soldier used for the Ironbridge and Dartford memorials and carries the inscription "TO KEEP IN MIND THOSE FROM THIS PLACE / WHO GAVE THEIR LIVES IN THE GREAT WAR / 1914–1918" There are two relief panels with Naval and Air Force scenes.
Chesham War Memorial	Chesham, Buckinghamshire		Another version of the soldier used at Ironbridge, Dartford and Sevenoaks and this time in Portland stone, appears on Chesham's memorial. The inscription here reads "TO THE / GLORIOUS MEMORY / OF THE MEN OF / THIS TOWN WHO / GAVE THEIR LIVES / AND TO HONOUR / ALL WHO SERVED / OR SUFFERED IN / THE CAUSE OF GOD / KING AND COUNTRY / THEIR DEEDS LIVE AFTER THEM / FAITHFUL UNTO DEATH" 185 men of Chesham were lost in the 1914–1918 war and 77 in the 1939–1945 war.
Dickleburgh War Memorial	Dickleburgh, Norfolk		Dickleburgh War Memorial is a stone latin cross which was unveiled in 1920. The memorial lists 20 names for the First World War and nine for the Second World War.

=== Memorials to individuals and other statues ===
Work	Location	Image	Notes and References
Statues of Christ with St Peter and St Andrew	Wells Cathedral, Somerset		Walker was responsible for the central figures of Christ with St Peter and St Andrew in the row of statues above the high altar in the quire. They were given by Mrs Jessie Head in memory of her brother, Douglas McLean, just before the First World War.
Virgin and Child	Llandaff Cathedral, Cardiff		Commissioned on the recommendation of Sir Charles Nicholson, the cathedral architect, this as part of a re-ordering of the Lady Chapel between 1933 and 1935. The sculpture was to fill the central niche of a mediaeval reredos which was re-introduced to the Lady Chapel having been removed in 1908. Sir Charles had noted that Walker had completed a similar sculpture in a similar location at Wells Cathedral although not under his direction. He also advised that the Dean and Chapter should apply as few constraints as possible and the only condition was that the sculpture must not be coloured.
Statue of Emmeline Pankhurst	Victoria Tower Gardens, London		It was unveiled on 6 March 1930 by Stanley Baldwin and moved to the present site in 1956. The stone screens were added in 1959, to create the Emmeline and Christabel Pankhurst Memorial. There are two bronze plaques on the base of the statue. On the right is a portrait medallion of Christabel Pankhurst and on the left the design on the WSPU prisoners' badge.
Frederick Smith, 2nd Viscount Hambleden memorial	Lincoln's Inn Fields, London		Memorial to Frederick Smith, 2nd Viscount Hambledon (1868–1928), made in 1929. Smith was head of the W H Smith chain of newsagents, MP for the Strand Division and chairman of King's College Hospital. A Walker sculpture originally stood on the memorial plinth but this is no longer there.
John Wesley	New Room, Bristol, with copy in Washington D.C		Equestrian statue commissioned by Edward Lamplough for Broadmead Courtyard as part of restoration of the New Room in the 1930s. There is a replica in the Wesley Theological Seminary in Washington, D.C.
Statue of Lady Mount-Temple	Torquay, Devon		Bronze statue of Georgina Cowper-Temple, Lady Mount Temple, sister of Lord Tollemache of Helmington. Unveiled on 9 October 1903.
Florence Nightingale	Waterloo Place, London		Bronze statue of Florence Nightingale with sculpted bronze panels on the plinth.
Memorial tablet to Florence Nightingale	St Paul's Cathedral, London		Located in the Nelson Chamber's East Bay of the cathedral's crypt. It comprises a tablet with "Blessed are the merciful" written at the top and "Florence Nightingale" at the bottom. This is a sculpted marble and alabaster wall monument with a frame enclosing a relief sculpture by Walker which shows Florence Nightingale tending a wounded soldier. There is a round arched top which shows a woman holding a cup to a bed-ridden man whose head is in bandages.
Memorial to Florence Nightingale	St. Thomas's Hospital Chapel, London		This 1917 plaster relief, painted white and in an alabaster frame, is located in the St. Thomas's Hospital Chapel. It is in the south aisle near the chancel.
Dame Louisa Aldrich-Blake Memorial	Tavistock Square, London		Two bronze busts (possibly identical) facing in opposite directions on a stone plinth.
Memorial to Constance Kerr, Marchioness of Lothian	St Andrew's Church, Blickling, Norfolk		Marble relief to the widow of the eighth Marquess of Lothian, died 1901. Sculpture c. 1904.
Memorial to Pat Garnett	St Andrew's Church, Backwell, Somerset		The St Andrew's sculpture is a memorial to a local airman Pat Garnett and was sited below Backwell Hill House before becoming rusted and overgrown. It was restored and moved to the churchyard by Laurence Tindall in 1997.

=== Other works ===
Work	Location	Image	Notes and References
Christ at the Whipping Post	Tate Britain, London		This Walker work in ivory and dates to 1925. It was purchased for the Tate from the artist by the Trustees of the Chantrey Bequest. Walker had exhibited this piece at the Royal Academy in 1925. The work is not currently on display.
Roger Payne and William Morris	Victoria and Albert Museum, London		Walker sculpted two of the many single standing figures in niches which are located between the windows along the entire façade of the museum. Walker's figures appear on the Exhibition Road side of the building.
The Thorn			Bronze study of a nude girl removing a thorn from her leg, 20.5 inches (520 mm) high. Exhibited at the Royal Academy in 1903 and again at the Christopher Wood Galleries in London in 1980. An earlier, possibly plaster, version was exhibited at the Royal Academy in 1896.
The Dancer			Bronze statue, c. 1908.
A Nymph of Diana			Statue.
Death of the First-born			Bronze relief, c. 1904.
The Chariot of Elijah and The Scroll of Enoch	Church of the Ark of the Covenant, Stamford Hill (now the Cathedral of the Nativity of Our Lord, Upper Clapton)		Stone carving, c. 1892/95 part of a commission for statuary at the church.
