= Francis Warner (author) =

English poet and playwright

Francis Robert Le Plastrier Warner (21 October 1937 – 7 December 2021) was an English poet, playwright, musician, and scholar. Warner received early notice for his lyrical poetry but focused most of his later literary career on Agora, a cycle of plays that explore the development of Western culture up to the late 20th century. An Emeritus Fellow of St. Peter's College, Oxford, and Honorary Fellow of St. Catharine's College, Cambridge. He was also a noted advocate for experimental theatre, leading attempts during the 1960s and 1970s to establish a Samuel Beckett Theatre for avant-garde theatre production in Oxford.

== Early life and education ==
Warner was born in Bishopthorpe, Yorkshire, England, to Reverend Hugh Compton Warner and Nancy Le Plastrier Owen. After serving as vicar of Bishopthorpe from 1932 to 1938, Reverend Warner became vicar of St. Martin of Tours in Epsom in 1938, an incumbency he held until his resignation in 1950 to become education secretary of the Church of England Moral Welfare Council. Reverend Warner and his family lived in The Old Vicarage, Epsom, throughout World War II, an experience recalled later by Francis in the collection Beauty for Ashes: Selected Prose and Related Documents and the text of David Goode's Blitz Requiem. Warner was educated at Christ's Hospital, London College of Music, and St Catharine's College, Cambridge. Whilst at Cambridge, Warner was C.S. Lewis's last graduate student. The elder Warner, who had become an honorary canon of Guildford Cathedral in 1948, died in London, age 51, after a long illness, on 1 July 1956.

== Career ==
=== Academe ===
Warner spent much of his academic career at St Peter's College, Oxford, where he was Lord White Fellow, and Tutor in English Literature from 1965 to 1999. After retirement, he was elected Honorary Fellow of St Catharine's College, Cambridge, and emeritus Fellow of St Peter's College, Oxford.

=== Writing ===
Warner produced several volumes of lyrical poetry early in his career and was honoured for his poetry as the recipient of the Messing Award (now known as the St. Louis Literary Award) in 1972 by the St. Louis University Library Associates. Warner began writing plays in the early 1970s, creating a body of theatrical work that would later be styled as the dramatic play cycle Agora. In addition to the plays in Agora, Warner continued writing poetry, publishing several volumes throughout his later literary years.

==== Early Poetry ====
===== Agora =====
The dramatic cycle Agora encompasses the entirety of Warner's literary output as a dramatist. Consisting of 16 individual plays, loosely following a chronological order of action, Agora tracks the development of Western culture from ancient Greece to the present.

Agora: A Dramatic Epic
Title	Publication year	Grouping
Healing Nature – The Athens of Pericles	1988	none
Virgil and Caesar	1993	Roman Trilogy
Moving Reflections	1983	Roman Trilogy
Light Shadows	1980	Roman Trilogy
Byzantium	1990	none
Living Creation – Medici Florence	1985	Europa Tetralogy
King Francis I	1995	Europa Tetralogy
Goethe's Weimar	1997	Europa Tetralogy
Rembrandt's Mirror	2000	Europa Tetralogy
A Conception of Love	1978	none
Emblems	1972	Maquettes for the Requiem
Troat	1972	Maquettes for the Requiem
Lumen	1972	Maquettes for the Requiem
Lying Figures	1972	Requiem Trilogy
Killing Time	1976	Requiem Trilogy
Meeting Ends	1974	Requiem Trilogy
