= Herbert Marshall (writer) =

British writer, filmmaker, designer and scholar (1906–1991)

Herbert P. J. Marshall
- Born: 20 January 1906; East Ham, London, England, UK
- Died: 28 May 1991 (aged 85); Cowfold, West Sussex, England, UK
- Known for: writing, filmmaking, theatre design, theatre direction, education, Russian literature
- Spouse: Fredda Brilliant
- Awards: Edinburgh Film Festival Award

Herbert Percival James Marshall (20 January 1906—28 May 1991) was a British writer who was also involved in filmmaking, theater design and direction, education, and Russian literature.

== Personal life and career ==
In 1935, while living in Moscow, Marshall married Fredda Brilliant, a Polish-born actress and sculptor with whom he often collaborated. In 1937 they moved to London, and in 1939 they completed the script for the socialist film The Proud Valley.

At the onset of the World War II the couple became more involved in the theatre. Their most successful production was the London run of Robert Ardrey's anti-fascist play Thunder Rock, which Marshall directed and in which Brilliant acted. The production also starred Michael Redgrave, first at the Neighbourhood Theatre in South Kensington and then at The Globe in London's West End. Marshall produced the Boulting Brothers' film version of Thunder Rock (1942).

With his wife he co-wrote Tinker (1949), which Marshall directed. It is a semi-documentary film about the training young boys receive before their first jobs in mines. The film won the Edinburgh Film Festival Award in 1949.

In the 1950s and 60s Marshall and Brilliant lived in India. In 1966 they returned to the United States where he was offered a professorship in Soviet and East European studies at the University of Southern Illinois at Carbondale. He would eventually retire in 1979, having become distinguished professor of Soviet Literature and Theater Arts.

According to The New York Times, "Mr. Marshall also founded theatrical groups, served as director of the Old Vic Theater in London, was a consultant on theatrical architecture, and produced films and directed plays in the Soviet Union, England, Spain, India and the United States. ... He also translated scores of Russian poems, plays and short stories and wrote more than a dozen books and screenplays."
