= Master of Surgery =

Advanced academic and clinical qualification

The Master of Surgery (Latin: Magister Chirurgiae) is an advanced qualification in surgery, primarily found in the UK. The generic abbreviation for the degree is MS, although individual universities may instead use ChM, MCh or MChir for their qualifications. At a typical medical school the program lasts two to three years. The possession of a medical degree is a prerequisite. An MS may be awarded for clinical or academic competency. The regulations may ask for surgical experience and a thesis topic that is not purely medical.

== History ==
The Master of Surgery degree was introduced by the University of Glasgow in 1817 as the first degree in surgery offered by a British university. The course, although originally only two years in length, was more rigorous than the university's Doctor of Medicine and was immediately more popular, with 202 graduations in its first decade compared to 146 for the MD in the same period. The course was extended to three years in 1826 and then four years in 1839. The innovation of this degree was strongly opposed by the Faculty of Physicians and Surgeons of Glasgow (now the Royal College of Physicians and Surgeons of Glasgow), who saw it as encroaching on their right under their royal charter to control medicine and surgery in Glasgow, resulting in legal cases attempting to stop the university granting the degree that reached the House of Lords in 1840. Their decision forced graduates with the Master of Surgery to take the examinations of the faculty in order to practice in Glasgow (ended by the Medical Act 1858), but upheld the right of the university to award the degree.

In 1860, the commissioners the Universities (Scotland) Act 1858 made statutes for the Scottish universities of the time that established the degrees of Bachelor of Medicine and Master of Surgery in all of the universities of Scotland. These were awarded as a conjoint degree following a four year course. In 1892, the commissioners under the Universities (Scotland) Act 1889 made further statutes that changed the conjoint degree to Bachelor of Medicine and Bachelor of Surgery and converted the Master of Surgery into a higher degree, alongside the MD.

The Master of Surgery spread to England, where it was adopted by the University of Cambridge in 1860–61, over two decades before it instituted the Bachelor of Surgery. In 1895, Louisa Aldrich-Blake became the first woman to receiver a Master of Surgery, from the University of London. However, the growing popularity of the Fellowship of the Royal College of Surgeons (FRCS) led many universities to stop offering the Master of Surgery in the 20th century. By 1930, it could be studied at Cambridge, London, Bristol and Durham, as well as the Scottish universities, with considerable variation in the requirements between the institutions. The abbreviation used also varied considerably: MChir at Cambridge (changed from MC after the First World War to avoid confusion with the Military Cross), MS at London and Durham, and ChM at Bristol and the Scottish universities.

By the 1970s, the degree was normally taken after obtaining the FRCS. There continued to be considerable variation, with the degree lacking a standard definition. It was thus unclear whether the degree was intended to assess technical expertise or was a research degree, and what its intended role was in surgical training.
