= List of acts of the Parliament of the United Kingdom =

This is a list of acts of the Parliament of the United Kingdom from its establishment in 1801 up until the present.

== Lists of acts by year ==
=== 19th century ===
- List of acts of the Parliament of the United Kingdom from 1801
- List of acts of the Parliament of the United Kingdom from 1802
- List of acts of the Parliament of the United Kingdom from 1803
- List of acts of the Parliament of the United Kingdom from 1804
- List of acts of the Parliament of the United Kingdom from 1805
- List of acts of the Parliament of the United Kingdom from 1806
- List of acts of the Parliament of the United Kingdom from 1807
- List of acts of the Parliament of the United Kingdom from 1808
- List of acts of the Parliament of the United Kingdom from 1809

- List of acts of the Parliament of the United Kingdom from 1810
- List of acts of the Parliament of the United Kingdom from 1811
- List of acts of the Parliament of the United Kingdom from 1812
- List of acts of the Parliament of the United Kingdom from 1813
- List of acts of the Parliament of the United Kingdom from 1814
- List of acts of the Parliament of the United Kingdom from 1815
- List of acts of the Parliament of the United Kingdom from 1816
- List of acts of the Parliament of the United Kingdom from 1817
- List of acts of the Parliament of the United Kingdom from 1818
- List of acts of the Parliament of the United Kingdom from 1819

- List of acts of the Parliament of the United Kingdom from 1820
- List of acts of the Parliament of the United Kingdom from 1821
- List of acts of the Parliament of the United Kingdom from 1822
- List of acts of the Parliament of the United Kingdom from 1823
- List of acts of the Parliament of the United Kingdom from 1824
- List of acts of the Parliament of the United Kingdom from 1825
- List of acts of the Parliament of the United Kingdom from 1826
- List of acts of the Parliament of the United Kingdom from 1827
- List of acts of the Parliament of the United Kingdom from 1828
- List of acts of the Parliament of the United Kingdom from 1829

- List of acts of the Parliament of the United Kingdom from 1830
- List of acts of the Parliament of the United Kingdom from 1831
- List of acts of the Parliament of the United Kingdom from 1832
- List of acts of the Parliament of the United Kingdom from 1833
- List of acts of the Parliament of the United Kingdom from 1834
- List of acts of the Parliament of the United Kingdom from 1835
- List of acts of the Parliament of the United Kingdom from 1836
- List of acts of the Parliament of the United Kingdom from 1837
- List of acts of the Parliament of the United Kingdom from 1838
- List of acts of the Parliament of the United Kingdom from 1839

- List of acts of the Parliament of the United Kingdom from 1840
- List of acts of the Parliament of the United Kingdom from 1841
- List of acts of the Parliament of the United Kingdom from 1842
- List of acts of the Parliament of the United Kingdom from 1843
- List of acts of the Parliament of the United Kingdom from 1844
- List of acts of the Parliament of the United Kingdom from 1845
- List of acts of the Parliament of the United Kingdom from 1846
- List of acts of the Parliament of the United Kingdom from 1847
- List of acts of the Parliament of the United Kingdom from 1848
- List of acts of the Parliament of the United Kingdom from 1849

- List of acts of the Parliament of the United Kingdom from 1850
- List of acts of the Parliament of the United Kingdom from 1851
- List of acts of the Parliament of the United Kingdom from 1852
- List of acts of the Parliament of the United Kingdom from 1853
- List of acts of the Parliament of the United Kingdom from 1854
- List of acts of the Parliament of the United Kingdom from 1855
- List of acts of the Parliament of the United Kingdom from 1856
- List of acts of the Parliament of the United Kingdom from 1857
- List of acts of the Parliament of the United Kingdom from 1858
- List of acts of the Parliament of the United Kingdom from 1859

- List of acts of the Parliament of the United Kingdom from 1860
- List of acts of the Parliament of the United Kingdom from 1861
- List of acts of the Parliament of the United Kingdom from 1862
- List of acts of the Parliament of the United Kingdom from 1863
- List of acts of the Parliament of the United Kingdom from 1864
- List of acts of the Parliament of the United Kingdom from 1865
- List of acts of the Parliament of the United Kingdom from 1866
- List of acts of the Parliament of the United Kingdom from 1867
- List of acts of the Parliament of the United Kingdom from 1868
- List of acts of the Parliament of the United Kingdom from 1869

- List of acts of the Parliament of the United Kingdom from 1870
- List of acts of the Parliament of the United Kingdom from 1871
- List of acts of the Parliament of the United Kingdom from 1872
- List of acts of the Parliament of the United Kingdom from 1873
- List of acts of the Parliament of the United Kingdom from 1874
- List of acts of the Parliament of the United Kingdom from 1875
- List of acts of the Parliament of the United Kingdom from 1876
- List of acts of the Parliament of the United Kingdom from 1877
- List of acts of the Parliament of the United Kingdom from 1878
- List of acts of the Parliament of the United Kingdom from 1879

- List of acts of the Parliament of the United Kingdom from 1880
- List of acts of the Parliament of the United Kingdom from 1881
- List of acts of the Parliament of the United Kingdom from 1882
- List of acts of the Parliament of the United Kingdom from 1883
- List of acts of the Parliament of the United Kingdom from 1884
- List of acts of the Parliament of the United Kingdom from 1885
- List of acts of the Parliament of the United Kingdom from 1886
- List of acts of the Parliament of the United Kingdom from 1887
- List of acts of the Parliament of the United Kingdom from 1888
- List of acts of the Parliament of the United Kingdom from 1889

- List of acts of the Parliament of the United Kingdom from 1890
- List of acts of the Parliament of the United Kingdom from 1891
- List of acts of the Parliament of the United Kingdom from 1892
- List of acts of the Parliament of the United Kingdom from 1893
- List of acts of the Parliament of the United Kingdom from 1894
- List of acts of the Parliament of the United Kingdom from 1895
- List of acts of the Parliament of the United Kingdom from 1896
- List of acts of the Parliament of the United Kingdom from 1897
- List of acts of the Parliament of the United Kingdom from 1898
- List of acts of the Parliament of the United Kingdom from 1899

=== 20th century ===
- List of acts of the Parliament of the United Kingdom from 1900
- List of acts of the Parliament of the United Kingdom from 1901
- List of acts of the Parliament of the United Kingdom from 1902
- List of acts of the Parliament of the United Kingdom from 1903
- List of acts of the Parliament of the United Kingdom from 1904
- List of acts of the Parliament of the United Kingdom from 1905
- List of acts of the Parliament of the United Kingdom from 1906
- List of acts of the Parliament of the United Kingdom from 1907
- List of acts of the Parliament of the United Kingdom from 1908
- List of acts of the Parliament of the United Kingdom from 1909

- List of acts of the Parliament of the United Kingdom from 1910
- List of acts of the Parliament of the United Kingdom from 1911
- List of acts of the Parliament of the United Kingdom from 1912
- List of acts of the Parliament of the United Kingdom from 1913
- List of acts of the Parliament of the United Kingdom from 1914
- List of acts of the Parliament of the United Kingdom from 1915
- List of acts of the Parliament of the United Kingdom from 1916
- List of acts of the Parliament of the United Kingdom from 1917
- List of acts of the Parliament of the United Kingdom from 1918
- List of acts of the Parliament of the United Kingdom from 1919

- List of acts of the Parliament of the United Kingdom from 1920
- List of acts of the Parliament of the United Kingdom from 1921
- List of acts of the Parliament of the United Kingdom from 1922
- List of acts of the Parliament of the United Kingdom from 1923
- List of acts of the Parliament of the United Kingdom from 1924
- List of acts of the Parliament of the United Kingdom from 1925
- List of acts of the Parliament of the United Kingdom from 1926
- List of acts of the Parliament of the United Kingdom from 1927
- List of acts of the Parliament of the United Kingdom from 1928
- List of acts of the Parliament of the United Kingdom from 1929

- List of acts of the Parliament of the United Kingdom from 1930
- List of acts of the Parliament of the United Kingdom from 1931
- List of acts of the Parliament of the United Kingdom from 1932
- List of acts of the Parliament of the United Kingdom from 1933
- List of acts of the Parliament of the United Kingdom from 1934
- List of acts of the Parliament of the United Kingdom from 1935
- List of acts of the Parliament of the United Kingdom from 1936
- List of acts of the Parliament of the United Kingdom from 1937
- List of acts of the Parliament of the United Kingdom from 1938
- List of acts of the Parliament of the United Kingdom from 1939

- List of acts of the Parliament of the United Kingdom from 1940
- List of acts of the Parliament of the United Kingdom from 1941
- List of acts of the Parliament of the United Kingdom from 1942
- List of acts of the Parliament of the United Kingdom from 1943
- List of acts of the Parliament of the United Kingdom from 1944
- List of acts of the Parliament of the United Kingdom from 1945
- List of acts of the Parliament of the United Kingdom from 1946
- List of acts of the Parliament of the United Kingdom from 1947
- List of acts of the Parliament of the United Kingdom from 1948
- List of acts of the Parliament of the United Kingdom from 1949

- List of acts of the Parliament of the United Kingdom from 1950
- List of acts of the Parliament of the United Kingdom from 1951
- List of acts of the Parliament of the United Kingdom from 1952
- List of acts of the Parliament of the United Kingdom from 1953
- List of acts of the Parliament of the United Kingdom from 1954
- List of acts of the Parliament of the United Kingdom from 1955
- List of acts of the Parliament of the United Kingdom from 1956
- List of acts of the Parliament of the United Kingdom from 1957
- List of acts of the Parliament of the United Kingdom from 1958
- List of acts of the Parliament of the United Kingdom from 1959

- List of acts of the Parliament of the United Kingdom from 1960
- List of acts of the Parliament of the United Kingdom from 1961
- List of acts of the Parliament of the United Kingdom from 1962
- List of acts of the Parliament of the United Kingdom from 1963
- List of acts of the Parliament of the United Kingdom from 1964
- List of acts of the Parliament of the United Kingdom from 1965
- List of acts of the Parliament of the United Kingdom from 1966
- List of acts of the Parliament of the United Kingdom from 1967
- List of acts of the Parliament of the United Kingdom from 1968
- List of acts of the Parliament of the United Kingdom from 1969

- List of acts of the Parliament of the United Kingdom from 1970
- List of acts of the Parliament of the United Kingdom from 1971
- List of acts of the Parliament of the United Kingdom from 1972
- List of acts of the Parliament of the United Kingdom from 1973
- List of acts of the Parliament of the United Kingdom from 1974
- List of acts of the Parliament of the United Kingdom from 1975
- List of acts of the Parliament of the United Kingdom from 1976
- List of acts of the Parliament of the United Kingdom from 1977
- List of acts of the Parliament of the United Kingdom from 1978
- List of acts of the Parliament of the United Kingdom from 1979

- List of acts of the Parliament of the United Kingdom from 1980
- List of acts of the Parliament of the United Kingdom from 1981
- List of acts of the Parliament of the United Kingdom from 1982
- List of acts of the Parliament of the United Kingdom from 1983
- List of acts of the Parliament of the United Kingdom from 1984
- List of acts of the Parliament of the United Kingdom from 1985
- List of acts of the Parliament of the United Kingdom from 1986
- List of acts of the Parliament of the United Kingdom from 1987
- List of acts of the Parliament of the United Kingdom from 1988
- List of acts of the Parliament of the United Kingdom from 1989

- List of acts of the Parliament of the United Kingdom from 1990
- List of acts of the Parliament of the United Kingdom from 1991
- List of acts of the Parliament of the United Kingdom from 1992
- List of acts of the Parliament of the United Kingdom from 1993
- List of acts of the Parliament of the United Kingdom from 1994
- List of acts of the Parliament of the United Kingdom from 1995
- List of acts of the Parliament of the United Kingdom from 1996
- List of acts of the Parliament of the United Kingdom from 1997
- List of acts of the Parliament of the United Kingdom from 1998
- List of acts of the Parliament of the United Kingdom from 1999

=== 21st century ===
- List of acts of the Parliament of the United Kingdom from 2000
- List of acts of the Parliament of the United Kingdom from 2001
- List of acts of the Parliament of the United Kingdom from 2002
- List of acts of the Parliament of the United Kingdom from 2003
- List of acts of the Parliament of the United Kingdom from 2004
- List of acts of the Parliament of the United Kingdom from 2005
- List of acts of the Parliament of the United Kingdom from 2006
- List of acts of the Parliament of the United Kingdom from 2007
- List of acts of the Parliament of the United Kingdom from 2008
- List of acts of the Parliament of the United Kingdom from 2009

- List of acts of the Parliament of the United Kingdom from 2010
- List of acts of the Parliament of the United Kingdom from 2011
- List of acts of the Parliament of the United Kingdom from 2012
- List of acts of the Parliament of the United Kingdom from 2013
- List of acts of the Parliament of the United Kingdom from 2014
- List of acts of the Parliament of the United Kingdom from 2015
- List of acts of the Parliament of the United Kingdom from 2016
- List of acts of the Parliament of the United Kingdom from 2017
- List of acts of the Parliament of the United Kingdom from 2018
- List of acts of the Parliament of the United Kingdom from 2019

- List of acts of the Parliament of the United Kingdom from 2020
- List of acts of the Parliament of the United Kingdom from 2021
- List of acts of the Parliament of the United Kingdom from 2022
- List of acts of the Parliament of the United Kingdom from 2023
- List of acts of the Parliament of the United Kingdom from 2024
- List of acts of the Parliament of the United Kingdom from 2025
- List of acts of the Parliament of the United Kingdom from 2026

== Lists of acts by session of Parliament ==
- List of acts of the 1st session of the 42nd Parliament of the United Kingdom
- List of acts of the 2nd session of the 42nd Parliament of the United Kingdom
- List of acts of the 3rd session of the 42nd Parliament of the United Kingdom
- List of acts of the 4th session of the 42nd Parliament of the United Kingdom
- List of acts of the 5th session of the 42nd Parliament of the United Kingdom

- List of acts of the 1st session of the 43rd Parliament of the United Kingdom
- List of acts of the 2nd session of the 43rd Parliament of the United Kingdom

- List of acts of the 1st session of the 44th Parliament of the United Kingdom
- List of acts of the 2nd session of the 44th Parliament of the United Kingdom
- List of acts of the 3rd session of the 44th Parliament of the United Kingdom
- List of acts of the 4th session of the 44th Parliament of the United Kingdom

- List of acts of the 1st session of the 45th Parliament of the United Kingdom
- List of acts of the 2nd session of the 45th Parliament of the United Kingdom
- List of acts of the 3rd session of the 45th Parliament of the United Kingdom
- List of acts of the 4th session of the 45th Parliament of the United Kingdom

- List of acts of the 46th Parliament of the United Kingdom

- List of acts of the 1st session of the 47th Parliament of the United Kingdom
- List of acts of the 2nd session of the 47th Parliament of the United Kingdom
- List of acts of the 3rd session of the 47th Parliament of the United Kingdom
- List of acts of the 4th session of the 47th Parliament of the United Kingdom
- List of acts of the 5th session of the 47th Parliament of the United Kingdom

- List of acts of the 1st session of the 48th Parliament of the United Kingdom
- List of acts of the 2nd session of the 48th Parliament of the United Kingdom
- List of acts of the 3rd session of the 48th Parliament of the United Kingdom

- List of acts of the 4th session of the 48th Parliament of the United Kingdom
- List of acts of the 1st session of the 49th Parliament of the United Kingdom
- List of acts of the 2nd session of the 49th Parliament of the United Kingdom
- List of acts of the 3rd session of the 49th Parliament of the United Kingdom
- List of acts of the 4th session of the 49th Parliament of the United Kingdom

- List of acts of the 1st session of the 50th Parliament of the United Kingdom
- List of acts of the 2nd session of the 50th Parliament of the United Kingdom
- List of acts of the 3rd session of the 50th Parliament of the United Kingdom
- List of acts of the 4th session of the 50th Parliament of the United Kingdom
- List of acts of the 5th session of the 50th Parliament of the United Kingdom

- List of acts of the 1st session of the 51st Parliament of the United Kingdom
- List of acts of the 2nd session of the 51st Parliament of the United Kingdom
- List of acts of the 3rd session of the 51st Parliament of the United Kingdom
- List of acts of the 4th session of the 51st Parliament of the United Kingdom
- List of acts of the 5th session of the 51st Parliament of the United Kingdom

- List of acts of the 1st session of the 52nd Parliament of the United Kingdom
- List of acts of the 2nd session of the 52nd Parliament of the United Kingdom
- List of acts of the 3rd session of the 52nd Parliament of the United Kingdom
- List of acts of the 4th session of the 52nd Parliament of the United Kingdom

- List of acts of the 1st session of the 53rd Parliament of the United Kingdom
- List of acts of the 2nd session of the 53rd Parliament of the United Kingdom
- List of acts of the 3rd session of the 53rd Parliament of the United Kingdom
- List of acts of the 4th session of the 53rd Parliament of the United Kingdom

- List of acts of the 1st session of the 54th Parliament of the United Kingdom
- List of acts of the 2nd session of the 54th Parliament of the United Kingdom
- List of acts of the 3rd session of the 54th Parliament of the United Kingdom
- List of acts of the 4th session of the 54th Parliament of the United Kingdom
- List of acts of the 5th session of the 54th Parliament of the United Kingdom

- List of acts of the 1st session of the 55th Parliament of the United Kingdom
- List of acts of the 2nd session of the 55th Parliament of the United Kingdom
- List of acts of the 3rd session of the 55th Parliament of the United Kingdom
- List of acts of the 4th session of the 55th Parliament of the United Kingdom

- List of acts of the 1st session of the 56th Parliament of the United Kingdom
- List of acts of the 2nd session of the 56th Parliament of the United Kingdom

- List of acts of the 1st session of the 57th Parliament of the United Kingdom
- List of acts of the 2nd session of the 57th Parliament of the United Kingdom

- List of acts of the 1st session of the 58th Parliament of the United Kingdom
- List of acts of the 2nd session of the 58th Parliament of the United Kingdom
- List of acts of the 3rd session of the 58th Parliament of the United Kingdom
- List of acts of the 4th session of the 58th Parliament of the United Kingdom

- List of acts of the 1st session of the 59th Parliament of the United Kingdom

== See also ==
Note that the first parliament of the United Kingdom was held in 1801; parliaments between 1707 and 1800 were either parliaments of Great Britain or of Ireland. For acts passed up until 1707, see the list of acts of the Parliament of England and the list of acts of the Parliament of Scotland. For acts passed from 1707 to 1800, see the list of acts of the Parliament of Great Britain. See also the list of acts of the Parliament of Ireland.

For acts of the devolved parliaments and assemblies in the United Kingdom, see the lists of acts of the Scottish Parliament, the list of acts of the Northern Ireland Assembly, and the list of acts and measures of Senedd Cymru; see also the list of acts of the Parliament of Northern Ireland.
