= List of acts of the 3rd session of the 50th Parliament of the United Kingdom =

This is a list of acts of the 3rd session of the 50th Parliament of the United Kingdom, which ran from 21 November 1989 until 1 November 1990.

Acts passed since 1963 are cited by calendar year, as opposed to the convention used for earlier acts of citing the regnal year(s) in which the relevant parliamentary session was held. Each act passed in a respective year is given a chapter number (abbreviated "c."), denoted by Arabic numerals in the case of public general acts, lowercase Roman numerals in the case of local acts, or italicised Arabic numerals in the case of personal acts. These run as separate series.

78 acts of Parliament were passed by the 50th Parliament in its 3rd session: 45 public general acts and 33 local acts.

indicates that an act is available to view at legislation.gov.uk, and indicates the location of the original act in the Parliamentary Archives.

== Public general acts ==
{{legislationuk|act |- | {{|Consolidated Fund (No. 2) Act 1989|public|46|21-12-1989|maintained=y|An Act to apply certain sums out of the Consolidated Fund to the service of the years ending on 31st March 1990 and 1991.}} |- | {{|Capital Allowances Act 1990|public|1|19-03-1990|maintained=y|An Act to consolidate certain enactments relating to capital allowances.}} |- | {{|Civil Aviation Authority (Borrowing Powers) Act 1990|public|2|19-03-1990|maintained=y|An Act to increase the Civil Aviation Authority's statutory borrowing limit with power to make further increases by order; and to extend the Authority's power to borrow in currencies other than sterling so as to include power to borrow in units of account defined by reference to more than one currency.}} |- | {{|Coal Industry Act 1990|public|3|19-03-1990|maintained=y|An Act to make new provision with respect to grants by the Secretary of State to the British Coal Corporation and further provision with respect to grants and loans under existing powers; and to make provision as to the licensing of coal working, searching and boring and the preservation of amenity in connection with opencast coal working.}} |- | {{|Consolidated Fund Act 1990|public|4|28-03-1990|maintained=y|An Act to apply certain sums out of the Consolidated Fund to the service of the years ending on 31st March 1989, 1990 and 1991.}} |- | {{|Criminal Justice (International Co-operation) Act 1990|public|5|05-04-1990|maintained=y|An Act to enable the United Kingdom to co-operate with other countries in criminal proceedings and investigations; to enable the United Kingdom to join with other countries in implementing the Vienna Convention against Illicit Traffic in Narcotic Drugs and Psychotropic Substances; and to provide for the seizure, detention and forfeiture of drug trafficking money imported or exported in cash.}} |- | {{|Education (Student Loans) Act 1990|public|6|26-04-1990|maintained=y|An Act to provide for the making to students in higher education of loans towards their maintenance.}} |- | {{|Pensions (Miscellaneous Provisions) Act 1990|public|7|24-05-1990|maintained=y|An Act to amend the law relating to certain public service pension schemes.}} |- | {{|Town and Country Planning Act 1990|public|8|24-05-1990|maintained=y|An Act to consolidate certain enactments relating to town and country planning (excluding special controls in respect of buildings and areas of special architectural or historic interest and in respect of hazardous substances) with amendments to give effect to recommendations of the Law Commission.}} |- | {{|Planning (Listed Buildings and Conservation Areas) Act 1990|public|9|24-05-1990|maintained=y|An Act to consolidate certain enactments relating to special controls in respect of buildings and areas of special architectural or historic interest with amendments to give effect to recommendations of the Law Commission.}} |- | {{|Planning (Hazardous Substances) Act 1990|public|10|24-05-1990|maintained=y|An Act to consolidate certain enactments relating to special controls in respect of hazardous substances with amendments to give effect to recommendations of the Law Commission.}} |- | {{|Planning (Consequential Provisions) Act 1990|public|11|24-05-1990|maintained=y|An Act to make provision for repeals, consequential amendments, transitional and transitory matters and savings in connection with the consolidation of enactments in the Town and Country Planning Act 1990, the Planning (Listed Buildings and Conservation Areas) Act 1990 and the Planning (Hazardous Substances) Act 1990 (including provisions to give effect to recommendations of the Law Commission).}} |- | {{|Property Services Agency and Crown Suppliers Act 1990|public|12|29-06-1990|maintained=y|An Act to make provision for the transfer of the Crown services known as the Property Services Agency and the Crown Suppliers; and for connected purposes.}} |- | {{|Greenwich Hospital Act 1990|public|13|29-06-1990|maintained=y|An Act to enable the Royal Hospital School to admit both girls and boys and, in either case, regardless of any seafaring family connection; and for purposes connected therewith.}} |- | {{|Pakistan Act 1990|public|14|29-06-1990|maintained=y|An Act to make provision in connection with the re-admission of Pakistan as a member of the Commonwealth.}} |- | {{|Agricultural Holdings (Amendment) Act 1990|public|15|29-06-1990|maintained=y|An Act to amend Case B in Part I of Schedule 3 to the Agricultural Holdings Act 1986; and for connected purposes.}} |- | {{|Food Safety Act 1990|public|16|29-06-1990|maintained=y|An Act to make new provision in place of the Food Act 1984 (except Parts III and V), the Food and Drugs (Scotland) Act 1956 and certain other enactments relating to food; to amend Parts III and V of the said Act of 1984 and Part I of the Food and Environment Protection Act 1985; and for connected purposes.}} |- | {{|Australian Constitution (Public Record Copy) Act 1990|public|17|29-06-1990|maintained=y|An Act to exclude one of the record copies of the Commonwealth of Australia Constitution Act 1900 from the public records to which the Public Records Act 1958 applies.}} |- | {{|Computer Misuse Act 1990|public|18|29-06-1990|maintained=y|An Act to make provision for securing computer material against unauthorised access or modification; and for connected purposes.}} |- | {{|National Health Service and Community Care Act 1990|public|19|29-06-1990|maintained=y|An Act to make further provision about health authorities and other bodies constituted in accordance with the National Health Service Act 1977; to provide for the establishment of National Health Service trusts; to make further provision about the financing of the practices of medical practitioners; to amend Part VII of the Local Government (Scotland) Act 1973 and Part III of the Local Government Finance Act 1982; to amend the National Health Service Act 1977 and the National Health Service (Scotland) Act 1978; to amend Part VIII of the Mental Health (Scotland) Act 1984; to make further provision concerning the provision of accommodation and other welfare services by local authorities and the powers of the Secretary of State as respects the social services functions of such authorities; to make provision for and in connection with the establishment of a Clinical Standards Advisory Group; to repeal the Health Services Act 1976; and for connected purposes.}} |- | {{|Entertainments (Increased Penalties) Act 1990|public|20|13-07-1990|maintained=y|An Act to increase the penalties for certain offences under enactments relating to the licensing of premises or places used for dancing, music or other entertainments of a like kind.}} |- | {{|Licensing (Low Alcohol Drinks) Act 1990 |public|21|13-07-1990|maintained=y|An Act to amend the definition of "intoxicating liquor" in the Licensing Act 1964 and "alcoholic liquor" in the Licensing (Scotland) Act 1976 with respect to alcohol in low alcohol drinks.}} |- | {{|Term and Quarter Days (Scotland) Act 1990|public|22|13-07-1990|maintained=y|An Act to regulate, in relation to Scotland, the dates of Whitsunday, Martinmas, Candlemas and Lammas; and for connected purposes.}} |- | {{|Access to Health Records Act 1990|public|23|13-07-1990|maintained=y|An Act to establish a right of access to health records by the individuals to whom they relate and other persons; to provide for the correction of inaccurate health records and for the avoidance of certain contractual obligations; and for connected purposes.}} |- | {{|Rights of Way Act 1990|public|24|13-07-1990|maintained=y|An Act to amend the law relating to rights of way and the disturbance and restoration of the surface of land over which rights of way pass; to keep the line of rights of way clear of crops; to enable local authorities to act in connection therewith; and for connected purposes.}} |- | {{|Horses (Protective Headgear for Young Riders) Act 1990|public|25|13-07-1990|maintained=y|An Act to secure the wearing of protective headgear by children while horse riding; to prescribe offences and penalties; and for connected purposes.}} |- | {{|Gaming (Amendment) Act 1990|public|26|13-07-1990|maintained=y|An Act to amend the provisions of the Gaming Act 1968 relating to premises licensed or registered under Part II of that Act.}} |- | {{|Social Security Act 1990|public|27|13-07-1990|maintained=y|An Act to amend the law relating to social security and to occupational and personal pension schemes; to establish and confer functions on a Pensions Ombudsman and a Registrar of Occupational and Personal Pension Schemes; to make provision for the payment of grants for the improvement of energy efficiency in certain dwellings; and for purposes connected therewith.}} |- | {{|Appropriation Act 1990|public|28|26-07-1990|maintained=y|An Act to apply a sum out of the Consolidated Fund to the service of the year ending on 31st March 1991, to appropriate the supplies granted in this Session of Parliament, and to repeal certain Consolidated Fund and Appropriation Acts.}} |- | {{|Finance Act 1990|public|29|26-07-1990|maintained=y|An Act to grant certain duties, to alter other duties, and to amend the law relating to the National Debt and the Public Revenue, and to make further provision in connection with Finance.}} |- | {{|Government Trading Act 1990|public|30|26-07-1990|maintained=y|An Act to amend the Government Trading Funds Act 1973 and section 5 of the Exchequer and Audit Departments Act 1921 and to repeal the Borrowing (Control and Guarantees) Act 1946.}} |- | {{|Aviation and Maritime Security Act 1990|public|31|26-07-1990|maintained=y|An Act to give effect to the Protocol for the Suppression of Unlawful Acts of Violence at Airports Serving International Civil Aviation which supplements the Convention for the Suppression of Unlawful Acts against the Safety of Civil Aviation; to make further provision with respect to aviation security and civil aviation; to give effect to the Convention for the Suppression of Unlawful Acts against the Safety of Maritime Navigation and to the Protocol for the Suppression of Unlawful Acts against the Safety of Fixed Platforms Located on the Continental Shelf which supplements that Convention; to make other provision for the protection of ships and harbour areas against acts of violence; and for connected purposes.}} |- | {{|Representation of the People Act 1990|public|32|26-07-1990|maintained=y|An Act to provide for a person no longer resident at his qualifying address or at any other address in the same area to be eligible for an absent vote for an indefinite period at Parliamentary elections in the United Kingdom and local government elections in Great Britain.}} |- | {{|Marriage (Registration of Buildings) Act 1990|public|33|26-07-1990|maintained=y|An Act to allow a building to be registered for the solemnization of marriages under section 41 of the Marriage Act 1949 notwithstanding that it forms part of another building.}} |- | {{|British Nationality (Hong Kong) Act 1990|public|34|26-07-1990|maintained=y|An Act to provide for the acquisition of British citizenship by selected Hong Kong residents, their spouses and minor children.}} |- | {{|Enterprise and New Towns (Scotland) Act 1990|public|35|26-07-1990|maintained=y|An Act to establish public bodies to be known as Scottish Enterprise and Highlands and Islands Enterprise and to make provision as to their functions; to dissolve the Scottish Development Agency and the Highlands and Islands Development Board; to make further provision as regards new towns in Scotland; and for connected purposes.}} |- | {{|Contracts (Applicable Law) Act 1990|public|36|26-07-1990|maintained=y|An Act to make provision as to the law applicable to contractual obligations in the case of conflict of laws.}} |- | {{|Human Fertilisation and Embryology Act 1990|public|37|01-11-1990|maintained=y|An Act to make provision in connection with human embryos and any subsequent development of such embryos; to prohibit certain practices in connection with embryos and gametes; to establish a Human Fertilisation and Embryology Authority; to make provision about the persons who in certain circumstances are to be treated in law as the parents of a child; and to amend the Surrogacy Arrangements Act 1985.}} |- | {{|Employment Act 1990|public|38|01-11-1990|maintained=y|An Act to make it unlawful to refuse employment, or any service of an employment agency, on grounds related to trade union membership; to amend the law relating to industrial action and ballots; to make further provision with respect to the Commissioner for the Rights of Trade Union Members; to confer a power to revise or revoke Codes of Practice; to provide for the merger of the Redundancy Fund with the National Insurance Fund; to amend the Education (Work Experience) Act 1973; and for connected purposes.}} |- | {{|Landlord and Tenant (Licensed Premises) Act 1990|public|39|01-11-1990|maintained=y|An Act to repeal section 43(1)(d) of the Landlord and Tenant Act 1954; and for connected purposes.}} |- | {{|Law Reform (Miscellaneous Provisions) (Scotland) Act 1990|public|40|01-11-1990|maintained=y|An Act, as respects Scotland, to make new provision for the regulation of charities; to provide for the establishment of a board having functions in connection with the provision of conveyancing and executry services by persons other than solicitors, advocates and incorporated practices; to provide as to rights of audience in courts of law, legal services and judicial appointments, and for the establishment and functions of an ombudsman in relation to legal services; to amend the law relating to liquor licensing; to make special provision in relation to the giving of evidence by children in criminal trials; to empower a sheriff court to try offences committed in the district of a different sheriff court in the same sheriffdom; to provide as to probation and community service orders and the supervision and care of persons on probation and on release from prison and for supervised attendance as an alternative to imprisonment on default in paying a fine; to amend Part I of the Criminal Justice (Scotland) Act 1987 with respect to the registration and enforcement of confiscation orders in relation to the proceeds of drug trafficking; to amend section 24 of the Housing (Scotland) Act 1987; to provide a system for the settlement by arbitration of international commercial disputes; to amend Part II of the Unfair Contract Terms Act 1977; and to make certain other miscellaneous reforms of the law.}} |- | {{|Courts and Legal Services Act 1990|public|41|01-11-1990|maintained=y|An Act to make provision with respect to the procedure in, and allocation of business between, the High Court and other courts; to make provision with respect to legal services; to establish a body to be known as the Lord Chancellor's Advisory Committee on Legal Education and Conduct and a body to be known as the Authorised Conveyancing Practitioners Board; to provide for the appointment of a Legal Services Ombudsman; to make provision for the establishment of a Conveyancing Ombudsman Scheme; to provide for the establishment of Conveyancing Appeal Tribunals; to amend the law relating to judicial and related pensions and judicial and other appointments; to make provision with respect to certain officers of the Supreme Court; (Note: Although the term "Supreme Court" was amended to "Senior Courts" in each place it occurs in the Act by the Constitutional Reform Act 2005 on 1 October 2009, the long title was exempted from amendment.) to amend the Solicitors Act 1974; to amend the Arbitration Act 1950; to make provision with respect to certain loans in respect of residential property; to make provision with respect to the jurisdiction of the Parliamentary Commissioner for Administration in connection with the functions of court staff; to amend the Children Act 1989 and make further provision in connection with that Act; and for connected purposes.}} |- | {{|Broadcasting Act 1990|public|42|01-11-1990|maintained=y|An Act to make new provision with respect to the provision and regulation of independent television and sound programme services and of other services provided on television or radio frequencies; to make provision with respect to the provision and regulation of local delivery services; to amend in other respects the law relating to broadcasting and the provision of television and sound programme services and to make provision with respect to the supply and use of information about programmes; to make provision with respect to the transfer of the property, rights and liabilities of the Independent Broadcasting Authority and the Cable Authority and the dissolution of those bodies; to make new provision relating to the Broadcasting Complaints Commission; to provide for the establishment and functions of a Broadcasting Standards Council; to amend the Wireless Telegraphy Acts 1949 to 1967 and the Marine, &c., Broadcasting (Offences) Act 1967; to revoke a class licence granted under the Telecommunications Act 1984 to run broadcast relay systems; and for connected purposes.}} |- | {{|Environmental Protection Act 1990|public|43|01-11-1990|maintained=y|An Act to make provision for the improved control of pollution arising from certain industrial and other processes; to re-enact the provisions of the Control of Pollution Act 1974 relating to waste on land with modifications as respects the functions of the regulatory and other authorities concerned in the collection and disposal of waste and to make further provision in relation to such waste; to restate the law defining statutory nuisances and improve the summary procedures for dealing with them, to provide for the termination of the existing controls over offensive trades or businesses and to provide for the extension of the Clean Air Acts to prescribed gases; to amend the law relating to litter and make further provision imposing or conferring powers to impose duties to keep public places clear of litter and clean; to make provision conferring powers in relation to trolleys abandoned on land in the open air; to amend the Radioactive Substances Act 1960; to make provision for the control of genetically modified organisms; to make provision for the abolition of the Nature Conservancy Council and for the creation of councils to replace it and discharge the functions of that Council and, as respects Wales, of the Countryside Commission; to make further provision for the control of the importation, exportation, use, supply or storage of prescribed substances and articles and the importation or exportation of prescribed descriptions of waste; to confer powers to obtain information about potentially hazardous substances; to amend the law relating to the control of hazardous substances on, over or under land; to amend section 107(6) of the Water Act 1989 and sections 31(7)(a), 31A(2)(c)(i) and 32(7)(a) of the Control of Pollution Act 1974; to amend the provisions of the Food and Environment Protection Act 1985 as regards the dumping of waste at sea; to make further provision as respects the prevention of oil pollution from ships; to make provision for and in connection with the identification and control of dogs; to confer powers to control the burning of crop residues; to make provision in relation to financial or other assistance for purposes connected with the environment; to make provision as respects superannuation of employees of the Groundwork Foundation and for remunerating the chairman of the Inland Waterways Amenity Advisory Council; and for purposes connected with those purposes.}} |- | {{|Caldey Island Act 1990|public|44|01-11-1990|maintained=y|An Act to provide for the islands of Caldey and St. Margaret's in the county of Dyfed to be included in the district of South Pembrokeshire for the purposes of local, parliamentary and European elections and for the purposes of local taxation; to include those islands in the districts of the Pembrokeshire coroner and the Pembrokeshire Health Authority; and for connected purposes.}} }}

== Local acts ==
{{legislationuk|act |- | {{|Scottish Episcopal Clergy Widows' and Orphans' Fund Order Confirmation Act 1989|local|18|21-12-1989|An Act to confirm a Provisional Order under the Private Legislation Procedure (Scotland) Act 1936, relating to Scottish Episcopal Clergy Widows' and Orphans' Fund.|po1=Scottish Episcopal Clergy Widows' and Orphans' Fund Order 1989|Provisional Order to transfer the assets of the Scottish Episcopal Clergy Widows' and Orphans' Fund to the trustees of the Scottish Episcopal Church Pension Fund and for purposes incidental thereto or consequential thereon.}} |- | {{|South Yorkshire Light Rail Transit Act 1989|local|19|21-12-1989|maintained=y|An Act to empower the South Yorkshire Passenger Transport Executive to construct additional works for the extension of their LRT system in the Lower Don Valley in the City of Sheffield and the Metropolitan Borough of Rotherham and to acquire lands for that purpose; to confer further powers upon the Executive; and for other purposes.}} |- | {{|St. George's Hill, Weybridge, Estate Act 1990|local|1|22-02-1990|An Act to make provision for the maintenance, preservation and regulation in the interest of the residents thereof of the St. George's Hill Estate at Weybridge in the borough of Elmbridge in the county of Surrey; and for other purposes.}} |- | {{|New Southgate Cemetery and Crematorium Limited Act 1990|local|2|22-02-1990|An Act to confirm an agreement between New Southgate Cemetery and Crematorium Limited and the National Spiritual Assembly of the Bahaʼis of the United Kingdom for the transfer to the said assembly of the freehold of certain lands forming part of the cemetery administered by the said company; and for other purposes.}} |- | {{|Hythe Marina Village (Southampton) Wavescreen Act 1990|local|3|22-02-1990|An Act to authorise Hythe Marina Limited to construct works in Southampton Water; and for other purposes.}} |- | {{|Isle of Wight Act 1990|local|4|22-02-1990|An Act to amend the Isle of Wight County Council Act 1971.}} |- | {{|Buckinghamshire County Council Act 1990|local|5|22-02-1990|An Act to relieve the Buckinghamshire County Council of their statutory duty to establish a new county secondary school at Shenley Church End in Buckinghamshire.}} |- | {{|United Medical Dental Schools Act 1990|local|6|22-02-1990|An Act to dissolve the First and Second Administration Councils of the United Medical and Dental Schools of Guy's and St. Thomas's Hospitals; to transfer to the Council of Governors of the Schools all rights, properties and liabilities of those Administration Councils; to make provision with respect to the administration and management of certain funds relating to the Schools; and for connected and other purposes.}} |- | {{|London Local Authorities Act 1990|local|7|22-02-1990|An Act to confer further powers upon local authorities in London; and for other purposes.}} |- | {{|Penzance Albert Pier Extension Act 1990|local|8|22-02-1990|An Act to empower the Penwith District Council to construct works at Penzance Harbour; and for other purposes.}} |- | {{|City of London (Spitalfields Market) Act 1990|local|9|22-02-1990|An Act to provide for the alteration of the site of Spitalfields Market; and for other purposes.}} |- | {{|British Railways Order Confirmation Act 1990|local|10|19-03-1990|An Act to confirm a Provisional Order under the Private Legislation Procedure (Scotland) Act 1936, relating to British Railways.|po1=British Railways Order 1990|Provisional Order to empower the British Railways Board to construct a work and to purchase or use land; to confer further powers on the Board; and for other purposes.}} |- | {{|Strathclyde Regional Council Order Confirmation Act 1990|local|11|28-03-1990|An Act to confirm a Provisional Order under the Private Legislation Procedure (Scotland) Act 1936, relating to Strathclyde Regional Council.|po1=Strathclyde Regional Council Order 1990|Provisional Order to authorise a motor rally on certain public roads on the Island of Mull; to confer powers on the Strathclyde Regional Council in relation thereto; and for other purposes.}} |- | {{|British Film Institute Southbank Act 1990|local|12|28-03-1990|An Act to free certain land on the south bank of the river Thames from any trust which allows the use thereof by the public as an open space.}} |- | {{|Birmingham City Council Act 1990|local|13|28-03-1990|An Act to authorise the control of establishments for massage or special treatment in the city of Birmingham.}} |- | {{|Nottingham Park Estate Act 1990|local|14|05-04-1990|maintained=y|An Act to make revised provision for the funding of The Nottingham Park Estate Limited; to confer certain powers on The Nottingham Park Estate Limited in relation to the Nottingham Park Estate; and for other purposes.}} |- | {{|Greater Manchester (Light Rapid Transit System) Act 1990|local|15|26-04-1990|maintained=y|An Act to empower the Greater Manchester Passenger Transport Executive to construct additional works and to acquire lands; to confer further powers on the Executive; and for other purposes.}} |- | {{|Happisburgh Lighthouse Act 1990|local|16|26-04-1990|An Act to establish and constitute the Happisburgh Lighthouse Trust; to appoint the Trust to be a local lighthouse authority; to confer on the Trust power to operate and maintain Happisburgh lighthouse in the county of Norfolk; and for connected purposes.}} |- | {{|Bromley London Borough Council (Crystal Palace) Act 1990|local|17|29-06-1990|An Act to provide for the leasing of land at Crystal Palace.}} |- | {{|South Yorkshire Light Rail Transit Act 1990|local|18|29-06-1990|maintained=y|An Act to empower the South Yorkshire Passenger Transport Executive to construct certain works in substitution for works authorised by the South Yorkshire Light Rail Transit Act 1988 and other enactments; to confer further powers upon the Executive, and for other purposes.}} |- | {{|River Tees Barrage and Crossing Act 1990|local|19|26-07-1990|maintained=y|An Act to empower the Teesside Development Corporation to construct a barrage in and across the river Tees; to construct a road bridge and footbridge over the river Tees; and in connection therewith to execute other works and to acquire lands; to provide for the control and development of part of the river Tees for amenity and recreation; and for other purposes.}} |- | {{|Hasmonean High School Act 1990|local|20|26-07-1990|An Act to relieve the Governors of the Hasmonean High School of their statutory duties to accommodate the entire school at a single site and to provide only two forms of entry for girls; and for related purposes.}} |- | {{|Associated British Ports Act 1990|local|21|26-07-1990|An Act to empower Associated British Ports to construct works and to acquire lands; to confer further powers on A.B. Ports; and for other purposes.}} |- | {{|Medway Tunnel Act 1990|local|22|26-07-1990|An Act to authorise the Wardens and Assistants of Rochester Bridge in the county of Kent to construct works and to acquire lands; and for other purposes.}} |- | {{|Greater Manchester (Light Rapid Transit System) (No. 2) Act 1990|local|23|26-07-1990|An Act to empower the Greater Manchester Passenger Transport Executive to construct further works and to acquire lands; to confer further powers on the Executive; and for other purposes.}} |- | {{|City of London (Various Powers) Act 1990|local|24|26-07-1990|An Act to empower the Conservators of Epping Forest to grant to the Secretary of State for Transport rights or interests in land for road purposes; to make further provision for the regulation of horse-riding in Epping Forest; to amend provisions relating to Blackfriars Underpass, city walkways, the regulation of highways within the city, traffic in Billingsgate Market, the registration of houseboats and the City of London School; and for other purposes.}} |- | {{|British Railways Act 1990|local|25|26-07-1990|An Act to empower the British Railways Board to construct works and to purchase or use land; to extend the time for the compulsory purchase of certain land; to confer further powers on the Board; and for other purposes.}} |- | {{|Penzance South Pier Extension Act 1990|local|26|26-07-1990|An Act to empower the Penwith District Council to construct works at Penzance Harbour; and for other purposes.}} |- | {{|Great Yarmouth Port Authority Act 1990|local|27|26-07-1990|maintained=y|An Act to provide for the closure to the public of certain lands in or adjoining the Port of Great Yarmouth; to confer further powers on the Great Yarmouth Port Authority to give directions to vessels; and for other purposes.}} |- | {{|City of Dundee District Council Order Confirmation Act 1990|local|28|01-11-1990|An Act to confirm a Provisional Order under the Private Legislation Procedure (Scotland) Act 1936, relating to City of Dundee District Council.|po1=City of Dundee District Council Order 1990|Provisional Order to re-enact with amendments certain local statutory provisions in force within the City of Dundee District; to confer further powers on the City of Dundee District Council; and for other purposes.}} |- | {{|Zetland Masonic Sick and Widows and Orphans Fund Order Confirmation Act 1990|local|29|01-11-1990|An Act to confirm a Provisional Order under the Private Legislation Procedure (Scotland) Act 1936, relating to Zetland Masonic Sick and Widows and Orphans Fund.|po1=Zetland Masonic Sick and Widows and Orphans Fund Order 1989|po1note1= (Note: Although passed in 1990, the short title specifies the year 1989.)|Provisional Order to provide for the dissolution of The Masonic Sick and Widows and Orphans Fund of Zetland and for the transfer of its assets to the General Lodge Benevolent Fund of the Masonic Lodge Morton Lerwick No. 89 on the Roll of the Grand Lodge of Scotland; and for other purposes.}} |- | {{|London Local Authorities (No. 2) Act 1990|local|30|01-11-1990|maintained=y|An Act to confer further powers upon local authorities in London; and for other purposes.}} |- | {{|Port of Tyne Act 1990|local|31|01-11-1990|maintained=y|An Act to make fresh provision for the controlling of works within the Port of Tyne; and for connected or other purposes.}} }}
