= List of acts of the 2nd session of the 57th Parliament of the United Kingdom =

This is a list of acts of the 2nd session of the 57th Parliament of the United Kingdom, which ran from 14 October 2019 until 6 November 2019.

Acts passed since 1963 are cited by calendar year, as opposed to the convention used for earlier acts of citing the regnal year(s) in which the relevant parliamentary session was held. Each act passed in a respective year is given a chapter number (abbreviated "c."), denoted by Arabic numerals in the case of public general acts, lowercase Roman numerals in the case of local acts, or italicised Arabic numerals in the case of personal acts. These run as separate series.

3 acts of Parliament were passed by the 57th Parliament in its 2nd session; all were public general acts.

indicates that an act is available to view at legislation.gov.uk, and indicates the location of the original act in the Parliamentary Archives.

== Public general acts ==
{{legislationuk|act |- | {{|Early Parliamentary General Election Act 2019|public|29|31-10-2019|maintained=y|archived=n|An Act to make provision for a parliamentary general election to be held on 12 December 2019.}} |- | {{|Northern Ireland Budget Act 2019|public|30|31-10-2019|maintained=y|archived=n|An Act to authorise the issue out of the Consolidated Fund of Northern Ireland of certain sums for the service of the year ending 31 March 2020; to appropriate those sums for specified purposes; to authorise the Department of Finance in Northern Ireland to borrow on the credit of the appropriated sums; and to authorise the use for the public service of certain resources (including accruing resources) for that year.}} |- | {{|Historical Institutional Abuse (Northern Ireland) Act 2019|public|31|05-11-2019|maintained=y|archived=n|An Act to establish the Historical Institutional Abuse Redress Board and to confer an entitlement to compensation in connection with children who were resident in certain institutions in Northern Ireland; and to establish the Commissioner for Survivors of Institutional Childhood Abuse.}} }}
