= List of acts of the 2nd session of the 45th Parliament of the United Kingdom =

This is a list of acts of the 2nd session of the 45th Parliament of the United Kingdom, which ran from 2 November 1971 until 26 October 1972.

Acts passed since 1963 are cited by calendar year, as opposed to the convention used for earlier acts of citing the regnal year(s) in which the relevant parliamentary session was held. Each act passed in a respective year is given a chapter number (abbreviated "c."), denoted by Arabic numerals in the case of public general acts, lowercase Roman numerals in the case of local acts, or italicised Arabic numerals in the case of personal acts. These run as separate series.

130 acts of Parliament were passed by the 45th Parliament in its 2nd session: 76 public general acts, 53 local acts and 1 personal act.

indicates that an act is available to view at legislation.gov.uk, and indicates the location of the original act in the Parliamentary Archives.

== Public general acts ==
{{legislationuk|act |- | {{|Consolidated Fund (No. 3) Act 1971|public|79|16-12-1971|An Act to apply certain sums out of the Consolidated Fund to the service of the years ending on 31st March 1972 and 1973.}} |- | {{|Banking and Financial Dealings Act 1971|public|80|16-12-1971|maintained=y|An Act to make new provision in place of the Bank Holidays Act 1871, to confer power to suspend financial and other dealings on bank holidays or other days, and to amend the law relating to bills of exchange and promissory notes with reference to the maturity of bills and notes and other matters affected by the closing of banks on Saturdays, and for purposes connected therewith.}} |- | {{|New Towns Act 1971|public|81|16-12-1971|An Act to raise the limit on advances imposed by section 43 of the New Towns Act 1965, as amended by subsequent enactments.}} |- | {{|Sierra Leone Republic Act 1972|public|1|10-02-1972|maintained=y|An Act to make provision as to the operation of the law in relation to Sierra Leone as a republic within the Commonwealth.}} |- | {{|Island of Rockall Act 1972|public|2|10-02-1972|maintained=y|An Act to make provision for the incorporation of that part of Her Majesty's Dominions known as the Island of Rockall into that part of the United Kingdom known as Scotland, and for purposes connected therewith.}} |- | {{|Ministerial and other Salaries Act 1972|public|3|10-02-1972|An Act to make new provision as to the salaries payable to the holders of Ministerial and other offices, and for purposes connected therewith.}} |- | {{|National Insurance Regulations (Validation) Act 1972|public|4|10-02-1972|An Act to validate part of the National Insurance (Earnings-related Benefit) Regulations 1966.}} |- | {{|Local Employment Act 1972|public|5|10-02-1972|maintained=y|An Act to consolidate, with certain exceptions, the provisions of the Local Employment Acts 1960 to 1971.}} |- | {{|Summer Time Act 1972|public|6|10-02-1972|maintained=y|An Act to consolidate the enactments relating to summer time.}} |- | {{|Civil List Act 1972|public|7|24-02-1972|maintained=y|An Act to make further provision for the honour and dignity of the Crown and the Royal Family, and for the payment of certain allowances and pensions.}} |- | {{|Airports Authority Act 1972|public|8|24-02-1972|An Act to increase the statutory limit on the amounts outstanding in respect of borrowings by the British Airports Authority and to enable the Authority to borrow money in currencies other than sterling.}} |- | {{|Mineral Exploration and Investment Grants Act 1972|public|9|24-02-1972|maintained=y|An Act to authorise the giving of financial assistance in connection with mineral exploration, and to clarify or extend certain exceptions from the abolition of investment grants.}} |- | {{|Northern Ireland Act 1972|public|10|24-02-1972|maintained=y|An Act to declare the law as to the legislative powers of the Parliament of Northern Ireland under section 4(1) of the Government of Ireland Act 1920, so far as relates to Her Majesty's forces and in particular to the conferment of powers, authorities, privileges or immunities on them.}} |- | {{|Superannuation Act 1972|public|11|01-03-1972|maintained=y|An Act to amend the law relating to pensions and other similar benefits payable to or in respect of persons in certain employment; to provide for distribution without proof of title of certain sums due to or in respect of certain deceased persons; to abolish the Civil Service Committee for Northern Ireland; to repeal section 6 of the Appropriation Act 1957; and for purposes connected with the matters aforesaid.}} |- | {{|Iron and Steel Act 1972|public|12|01-03-1972|An Act to make new provision with respect to the finances of the British Steel Corporation and to clarify the Corporation's powers and duties in respect of iron and steel activities.}} |- | {{|Consolidated Fund Act 1972|public|13|23-03-1972|An Act to apply certain sums out of the Consolidated Fund to the service of the years ending on 31st March 1971, 1972 and 1973.}} |- | {{|Transport Holding Company Act 1972|public|14|23-03-1972|maintained=y|An Act to make further provision with respect to the disposal of assets by, and the dissolution of, the Transport Holding Company, with respect to the making of grants to the company towards their expenses in disposing of assets or preparing for their dissolution, or towards discharging liabilities imposed on them under the provision so made, and with respect to pensions and compensation for loss of employment in respect of employees of bodies which cease to be subsidiaries of the company; and for purposes connected with those matters.}} |- | {{|Transport (Grants) Act 1972|public|15|23-03-1972|maintained=y|An Act to authorise the Secretary of State to make grants to the British Railways Board and to the National Bus Company, and to make contributions to expenditure by the British Railways Board or their subsidiaries intended to promote employment.}} |- | {{|Harbours (Loans) Act 1972|public|16|23-03-1972|maintained=y|An Act to provide for loans to harbour authorities to enable them to pay certain debts; to provide for the payment to the Secretary of State of the amount of past loans made by him for that purpose to such authorities; to impose a limit on loans made for that purpose to harbour authorities, on such payments and on loans made under section 11 of the Harbours Act 1964, in substitution for the existing limit on the latter; and for connected purposes.}} |- | {{|Electricity Act 1972|public|17|23-03-1972|An Act to increase the statutory limits imposed on the amounts outstanding in respect of borrowings by the Electricity Council and Electricity Boards, to authorise contributions by the Secretary of State to expenditure intended to promote employment and to make further provision for the transfer of property between Electricity Boards.}} |- | {{|Maintenance Orders (Reciprocal Enforcement) Act 1972|public|18|23-03-1972|maintained=y|An Act to make new provision, applying throughout the United Kingdom, in place of the Maintenance Orders (Facilities for Enforcement) Act 1920; to make provision with a view to the accession by the United Kingdom to the United Nations Convention on the Recovery Abroad of Maintenance done at New York on 20th June 1956; to make other provision for facilitating the recovery of maintenance by or from persons in the United Kingdom from or by persons in other countries; to extend the jurisdiction of magistrates' courts to hear complaints by or against persons outside England and Wales; and for purposes connected with the matters aforesaid.}} |- | {{|Sunday Cinema Act 1972|public|19|30-03-1972|maintained=y|An Act to amend the Sunday Entertainments Act 1932.}} |- | {{|Road Traffic Act 1972|public|20|30-03-1972|maintained=y|An Act to consolidate certain enactments relating to road traffic with amendments to give effect to recommendations of the Law Commission and the Scottish Law Commission.}} |- | {{|Deposit of Poisonous Waste Act 1972|public|21|30-03-1972|maintained=y|An Act to penalise the depositing on land of poisonous, noxious or polluting waste so as to give rise to an environmental hazard, and to make offenders liable for any resultant damage; to require the giving of notices in connection with the removal and deposit of waste; and for connected purposes.}} |- | {{|Northern Ireland (Temporary Provisions) Act 1972|public|22|30-03-1972|maintained=y|An Act to make temporary provision for the government of Northern Ireland, and for purposes connected therewith.}} |- | {{|Consolidated Fund (No. 2) Act 1972|public|23|11-05-1972|An Act to apply a sum out of the Consolidated Fund to the service of the year ending on 31st March 1973.}} |- | {{|Social Work (Scotland) Act 1972|public|24|11-05-1972|maintained=y|An Act to amend section 30 of the Social Work (Scotland) Act 1968.}} |- | {{|Betting and Gaming Duties Act 1972|public|25|11-05-1972|maintained=y|An Act to consolidate certain enactments concerning the duties of excise relating to betting and gaming.}} |- | {{|Sunday Theatre Act 1972|public|26|11-05-1972|maintained=y|An Act to permit and regulate the opening and use of theatres on Sundays, and for purposes connected therewith.}} |- | {{|Road Traffic (Foreign Vehicles) Act 1972|public|27|11-05-1972|maintained=y|An Act to make provision, in relation to foreign goods vehicles and foreign public service vehicles, for securing the observance of certain statutory provisions relating to road traffic; and for purposes connected with those matters.}} |- | {{|Employment Medical Advisory Service Act 1972|public|28|11-05-1972|maintained=y|An Act to provide for the establishment by the Secretary of State of an employment medical advisory service, to amend the Factories Act 1961 in relation to medical arrangements and related matters and in relation to the obstruction of inspectors, and for purposes connected therewith.}} |- | {{|Harbours, Piers and Ferries (Scotland) Act 1972|public|29|12-06-1972|maintained=y|An Act to make provision for extending the power of the Secretary of State under section 7 of the Harbours, Piers and Ferries (Scotland) Act 1937 to authorise the undertaking by certain local and harbour authorities of operations in connection with marine works.}} |- | {{|Civil Evidence Act 1972|public|30|12-06-1972|maintained=y|An Act to make, for civil proceedings in England and Wales, provision as to the admissibility in evidence of statements of opinion and the reception of expert evidence; and to facilitate proof in such proceedings of any law other than that of England and Wales.}} |- | {{|Sound Broadcasting Act 1972|public|31|12-06-1972|An Act to extend the functions of the Independent Television Authority, renamed the Independent Broadcasting Authority, so as to include the provision of local sound broadcasting services, and to amend and supplement the Television Act 1964 for the purpose of so extending the functions of the Authority; and for purposes connected with those matters.}} |- | {{|Performers' Protection Act 1972|public|32|29-06-1972|maintained=y|An Act to amend the Performers' Protection Acts 1958 and 1963.}} |- | {{|Carriage by Railway Act 1972|public|33|29-06-1972|An Act to amend the law relating to carriage by rail in connection with certain international conventions, and for purposes connected therewith.}} |- | {{|Trade Descriptions Act 1972|public|34|29-06-1972|maintained=y|An Act to require certain names and marks applied to imported goods to be accompanied by an indication of origin.}} |- | {{|Defective Premises Act 1972|public|35|29-06-1972|maintained=y|An Act to impose duties in connection with the provision of dwellings and otherwise to amend the law of England and Wales as to liability for injury or damage caused to persons through defects in the state of premises.}} |- | {{|National Insurance (Amendment) Act 1972|public|36|29-06-1972|An Act to amend the provisions of the National Insurance Acts 1965 to 1971 relating to the earnings rule for retirement pensions and to make parallel provision for Northern Ireland.}} |- | {{|Salmon and Freshwater Fisheries Act 1972|public|37|29-06-1972|An Act to amend the law relating to the regulation and control of fishing for salmon, trout, freshwater fish and eels, the protection and conservation of fisheries for such fish, the times of fishing for and selling such fish and the enforcement of the provisions of that law; and for connected purposes.}} |- | {{|Matrimonial Proceedings (Polygamous Marriages) Act 1972|public|38|29-06-1972|maintained=y|An Act to enable matrimonial relief to be granted, and declarations concerning the validity of a marriage to be made, notwithstanding that the marriage in question was entered into under a law which permits polygamy, and to make a consequential amendment in the Nullity of Marriage Act 1971.}} |- | {{|Police Act 1972|public|39|29-06-1972|maintained=y|An Act to relax the prohibition on the Police Federation for England and Wales or the Police Federation for Scotland being associated with any body or person outside the police service.}} |- | {{|Overseas Investment and Export Guarantees Act 1972|public|40|29-06-1972|An Act to authorise the Secretary of State to enter into certain agreements relating to overseas enterprises, and in particular to investment overseas, and to amend the Export Guarantees Act 1968.}} |- | {{|Finance Act 1972|public|41|27-07-1972|maintained=y|An Act to grant certain duties, to alter other duties, and to amend the law relating to the National Debt and the Public Revenue, and to make further provision in connection with Finance.}} |- | {{|Town and Country Planning (Amendment) Act 1972|public|42|27-07-1972|maintained=y|An Act to amend certain enactments relating to development plans, to extend the duration of and otherwise amend certain enactments relating to the control of office development, to make further provision for the service of building preservation notices and for controlling the demolition of buildings in conservation areas, and provision for the making of grants and loans in connection with the preservation or enhancement of the character or appearance of such areas, and for purposes connected with the matters aforesaid.}} |- | {{|Field Monuments Act 1972|public|43|27-07-1972|An Act to make provision for agreements for the protection of certain ancient monuments and consequential provision for payments under such agreements out of moneys provided by Parliament to occupiers of land which is the site of such a monument.}} |- | {{|Children Act 1972|public|44|27-07-1972|maintained=y|An Act to secure that the minimum age at which children may be employed is not affected by any further change in the school-leaving age.}} |- | {{|Trading Representations (Disabled Persons) Amendment Act 1972|public|45|27-07-1972|maintained=y|An Act to amend the Trading Representations (Disabled Persons) Act 1958.}} |- | {{|Housing (Financial Provisions) (Scotland) Act 1972|public|46|27-07-1972|maintained=y|An Act to introduce a new system of housing subsidies for housing authorities; to provide for rent rebate and rent allowance schemes administered by housing authorities; to make provision as to the housing accounts of local authorities; to amend the law about rents of houses and in particular those subject to the Rent (Scotland) Act 1971 or provided by housing authorities; and to make other provision as to housing finance.}} |- | {{|Housing Finance Act 1972|public|47|27-07-1972|maintained=y|An Act to introduce a new system of housing subsidies for housing authorities, to provide for rent rebate and rent allowance schemes administered by housing authorities, to amend the law about rents of dwellings and in particular those subject to the Rent Act 1968 or provided by housing authorities, and to make other provision as to housing finance.}} |- | {{|Parliamentary and other Pensions Act 1972|public|48|27-07-1972|maintained=y|An Act to make further provision with respect to the contributory pensions scheme for Members of the House of Commons, and to establish a similar scheme for the holders of certain Ministerial and other offices; to make further provision with respect to pensions and related benefits payable to or in respect of persons who have been Prime Minister, Speaker of the House of Commons or Lord Chancellor; to extend the application to Northern Ireland of certain enactments relating to pensions; and for purposes connected with those matters.}} |- | {{|Affiliation Proceedings (Amendment) Act 1972|public|49|27-07-1972|maintained=y|An Act to amend the law relating to proceedings for an affiliation order or for the variation, revocation or revival of such an order, and for connected purposes.}} |- | {{|Legal Advice and Assistance Act 1972|public|50|27-07-1972|An Act to make further provision for the purpose of making legal advice and assistance more readily available, including the employment of solicitors by the Law Society or the Law Society of Scotland for that purpose and for the purpose of giving legal aid; and to make provision for purposes connected with those matters.}} |- | {{|Chronically Sick and Disabled Persons (Scotland) Act 1972|public|51|27-07-1972|maintained=y|An Act to extend sections 1 and 2(1) of the Chronically Sick and Disabled Persons Act 1970 to Scotland.}} |- | {{|Town and Country Planning (Scotland) Act 1972|public|52|27-07-1972|maintained=y|An Act to consolidate certain enactments relating to town and country planning in Scotland with amendments to give effect to recommendations of the Scottish Law Commission.}} |- | {{|Contracts of Employment Act 1972|public|53|27-07-1972|An Act to consolidate certain enactments relating to contracts of employment.}} |- | {{|British Library Act 1972|public|54|27-07-1972|maintained=y|An Act to establish a national library for the United Kingdom under the control and management of a new Board and incorporating the Library of the British Museum; and for connected purposes.}} |- | {{|Sri Lanka Republic Act 1972|public|55|27-07-1972|maintained=y|An Act to make provision in connection with Ceylon becoming a republic within the Commonwealth under the name of Sri Lanka.}} |- | {{|Appropriation Act 1972|public|56|09-08-1972|An Act to apply a sum out of the Consolidated Fund to the service of the year ending on 31st March 1973, and to appropriate the supplies granted in this Session of Parliament.}} |- | {{|National Insurance Act 1972|public|57|09-08-1972|An Act to amend the provisions of the National Insurance Act 1965, the National Insurance (Industrial Injuries) Act 1965 and the Industrial Injuries and Diseases (Old Cases) Act 1967 as to the rate or amount of benefit and contributions; to alter the conditions for payment of attendance allowance and unemployability supplement; to modify certain provisions as to the determination of claims and questions under those Acts, and to make other administrative and financial adjustments; to make parallel provision for Northern Ireland; and for purposes connected with those matters.}} |- | {{|National Health Service (Scotland) Act 1972|public|58|09-08-1972|maintained=y|An Act to make further provision as respects the health service in Scotland, and for connected purposes.}} |- | {{|Administration of Justice (Scotland) Act 1972|public|59|09-08-1972|maintained=y|An Act to confer extended powers on the courts in Scotland to order the inspection of documents and other property, and related matters; to enable an appeal to be taken to the House of Lords from an interlocutor of the Court of Session on a motion for a new trial; to enable a case to be stated on a question of law to the Court of Session in an arbitration; and to enable alterations to be made by act of sederunt in the rate of interest to be included in sheriff court decrees or extracts.}} |- | {{|Gas Act 1972|public|60|09-08-1972|maintained=y|An Act to make fresh provision with respect to the gas industry in Great Britain and related matters, and for purposes connected therewith.}} |- | {{|Land Charges Act 1972|public|61|09-08-1972|maintained=y|An Act to consolidate certain enactments relating to the registration of land charges and other instruments and matters affecting land.}} |- | {{|Agriculture (Miscellaneous Provisions) Act 1972|public|62|09-08-1972|maintained=y|An Act to make new provision for the prevention of diseases suffered or disseminated by animals and to amend the Diseases of Animals Act 1950; to amend the law relating to slaughterhouses, to the slaughter of animals in Scotland and to the improvement of live stock; to amend Part II of the Agriculture Act 1967; to make new provision in relation to the Agricultural Marketing Fund and the Agricultural Marketing (Scotland) Fund; to increase the amount which may be advanced under section 2 of the Agriculture Mortgage Corporation Act 1956; to increase the penalties under the Agriculture (Poisonous Substances) Act 1952 and the Agriculture (Safety, Health and Welfare Provisions) Act 1956; to make new provision with respect to arbitrations under the Agricultural Holdings Act 1948; to amend the Cereals Marketing Act 1965; to amend the Corn Returns Act 1882 and the Corn Sales Act 1921; to make new provision for obtaining agricultural statistics; to make further provision as to the use of poison against grey squirrels or coypus; to clarify the Plant Health Act 1967 as respects the recovery of expenses incurred by an authority exercising default powers under orders made by virtue of that Act; to abolish agricultural executive committees and certain other committees having functions in relation to agriculture or apiculture; to confer powers on the Secretary of State in relation to certain parks and other land in Scotland; to repeal paragraph (f) of Case 14 in Schedule 3 to the Rent Act 1968 and paragraph (f) of Case 15 in Schedule 3 to the Rent (Scotland) Act 1971; and for purposes connected with those matters.}} |- | {{|Industry Act 1972|public|63|09-08-1972|maintained=y|An Act to authorise grants towards expenditure on the provision of assets for industry in certain regions in Great Britain, to authorise the provision of financial assistance for industry in those regions or elsewhere, and provisions about credits and grants for the building of ships and of offshore installations, to amend the Local Employment Act 1972 and to make temporary provision as to one of the areas to be treated as a development area under that Act; and for connected purposes.}} |- | {{|Harbours Development (Scotland) Act 1972|public|64|09-08-1972|maintained=y|An Act to enable the Secretary of State to develop, maintain and manage, or authorise other persons so to do, harbours in Scotland, made or maintained by him for any purpose, and for purposes connected therewith.}} |- | {{|National Debt Act 1972|public|65|09-08-1972|maintained=y|An Act to consolidate certain enactments relating to the national debt and the Director of Savings, with corrections and minor improvements made under the Consolidation of Enactments (Procedure) Act 1949.}} |- | {{|Poisons Act 1972|public|66|09-08-1972|maintained=y|An Act to consolidate certain enactments relating to poisons.}} |- | {{|Companies (Floating Charges and Receivers) (Scotland) Act 1972|public|67|17-10-1972|An Act to re-enact with modifications the law of Scotland in relation to floating charges; to make provision for the appointment and functioning of receivers in respect of incorporated companies which the Court of Session has jurisdiction to wind up; to confer on receivers or managers of the property and undertaking of a company incorporated in England certain powers over the property of that company in Scotland; and for purposes connected therewith.}} |- | {{|European Communities Act 1972|link=European Communities Act 1972 (UK)|public|68|17-10-1972|maintained=y|An Act to make provision in connection with the enlargement of the European Communities to include the United Kingdom, together with (for certain purposes) the Channel Islands, the Isle of Man and Gibraltar.}} |- | {{|Horserace Totalisator and Betting Levy Boards Act 1972|public|69|17-10-1972|maintained=y|An Act to extend the corporate powers of the Horserace Totalisator Board; to remove the limit on the number of members of that Board; to make provision with respect to applications by that Board for betting office licences; to transfer the functions of that Board with respect to the approval of horse racecourses to the Horserace Betting Levy Board; to facilitate the exercise of the functions of the government-appointed members of the Horserace Betting Levy Board; and for other purposes related to the activities of those Boards.}} |- | {{|Local Government Act 1972|public|70|26-10-1972|maintained=y|An Act to make provision with respect to local government and the functions of local authorities in England and Wales; to amend Part II of the Transport Act 1968; to confer rights of appeal in respect of decisions relating to licences under the Home Counties (Music and Dancing) Licensing Act 1926; to make further provision with respect to magistrates' courts committees; to abolish certain inferior courts of record; and for connected purposes.}} |- | {{|Criminal Justice Act 1972|public|71|26-10-1972|maintained=y|An Act to make further provision with respect to the administration of criminal justice, the criminal courts and the penal system, and to the methods of dealing with offenders (including the provision of new methods); to amend the law about qualification for jury service, the summoning of jurors and the payment of allowances in respect of jury service; to increase the penalties for certain offences and amend section 21 of the Firearms Act 1968 and section 9 of the Public Order Act 1936; and for purposes connected with those matters.}} |- | {{|National Health Service (Family Planning) Amendment Act 1972|public|72|26-10-1972|An Act to secure the provision, as part of the National Health Service, by local health authorities of voluntary vasectomy services on the same basis as the contraception services provided under the National Health Service (Family Planning) Act 1967.}} |- | {{|Museums and Galleries Admission Charges Act 1972|public|73|26-10-1972|maintained=y|An Act to remove impediments to the making of charges for admission to the national museums and galleries in Great Britain.}} }}

== Local acts ==
{{legislationuk|act |- | {{|Baird Trust Order Confirmation Act 1971|local|72|16-12-1971|An Act to confirm a Provisional Order under the Private Legislation Procedure (Scotland) Act 1936, relating to the Baird Trust.|po1=Baird Trust Order 1971|Provisional Order to confer powers on the Trustees of The Baird Trust with respect to the acceptance of gifts, legacies and transfers of property; to enable the said Trustees to enter into agreements and arrangements with other bodies; to increase the sum payable to the said Trustees in respect of their services; and for other purposes.}} |- | {{|Glasgow Corporation Order Confirmation Act 1971|local|73|16-12-1971|An Act to confirm a Provisional Order under the Private Legislation Procedure (Scotland) Act 1936, relating to Glasgow Corporation.|po1=Glasgow Corporation Order 1971|Provisional Order to make provision with respect to the granting of certificates for the sale of excisable liquor at the City Hall, Candleriggs, Glasgow; to amend the provisions of the Glasgow Streets Sewers and Buildings Consolidation Order 1937 with respect to the provision of wash-houses; to make provision with respect to the acquisition of land by agreement; to make provision for the imprisonment of convicted persons in certain circumstances without the option of a fine; to make further provision as to the powers of the trustees of the Ure Elder Fund for indigent widow ladies; and for other purposes.}} |- | {{|Clyde Port Authority Order Confirmation Act 1972|local|1|10-02-1972|An Act to confirm a Provisional Order under the Private Legislation Procedure (Scotland) Act 1936, relating to the Clyde Port Authority.|po1=Clyde Port Authority Order 1971|po1note1= (Note: Although passed in 1972, the short title specifies the year 1971.)|Provisional Order to authorise the Clyde Port Authority to establish a new superannuation scheme; to increase certain borrowing powers of that Authority; and for other purposes.}} |- | {{|New Zealand and Australian Land Company Limited Order Confirmation Act 1972|local|2|01-03-1972|An Act to confirm a Provisional Order under the Private Legislation Procedure (Scotland) Act 1936, relating to the New Zealand and Australian Land Company Limited.|po1=New Zealand and Australian Land Company Limited Order 1972|Provisional Order to make provision for the transfer to the State of New South Wales in the Commonwealth of Australia of the registered office of The New Zealand and Australian Land Company Limited; for the cessation of application to that company of provisions of the Companies Acts 1948 to 1967; and for other purposes incidental thereto.}} |- | {{|Stoke-on-Trent Corporation Act 1972|local|3|23-03-1972|An Act to confer powers on the lord mayor, aldermen and citizens of the city of Stoke-on-Trent in relation to the supply of steam for industrial use; and for other purposes.}} |- | {{|University of London King's College (Lease) Act 1972|local|4|23-03-1972|An Act to confer powers on the Secretary of State for the Environment to grant a lease of land and buildings on the Victoria Embankment to the University of London King's College; and for other purposes.}} |- | {{|Clyde River Purification Board Act 1972|local|5|11-05-1972|An Act to confer further powers on the Clyde River Purification Board in relation to the control of polluting discharges in or to underground strata and the promotion of cleanliness of the waters of their area; and for other purposes.}} |- | {{|Lloyds & Bolsa International Bank Act 1972|local|6|11-05-1972|An Act to provide for the transfer to Lloyds & Bolsa International Bank Limited of part of the undertaking of Bank of London & South America Limited and the undertaking of Lloyds Bank Europe Limited; and for other purposes incidental thereto and consequential thereon.}} |- | {{|Neath Corporation Act 1972|local|7|11-05-1972|An Act to make provision for the discontinuance of a slaughterhouse forming part of the markets undertaking of the mayor, aldermen and burgesses of the borough of Neath; and for other purposes.}} |- | {{|United Kingdom Oil Pipelines Act 1972|local|8|11-05-1972|An Act to empower United Kingdom Oil Pipelines Limited to acquire lands; and for other purposes.}} |- | {{|Saint Andrew's, Hove, Churchyard Act 1972|local|9|11-05-1972|An Act to amend certain provisions of the Hove Corporation Act 1966 relating to the churchyard of the church of Saint Andrew in the borough of Hove; to make further provision with respect to the remains of deceased persons interred in parts of that churchyard; and for other purposes.}} |- | {{|Oxfordshire and District Water Board Act 1972|local|10|12-06-1972|An Act to confer further powers on the Oxfordshire and District Water Board; and for other purposes.}} |- | {{|Solihull Corporation Act 1972|local|11|12-06-1972|An Act to confer powers upon the mayor, aldermen and burgesses of the county borough of Solihull with regard to finance; and for other purposes.}} |- | {{|Reigate Congregational Church Act 1972|local|12|12-06-1972|An Act to authorise the use of the burial ground attached to or comprised in the Reigate Congregational Church, and premises appurtenant thereto for building or otherwise; and for purposes incidental thereto.}} |- | {{|Whitley Bay Pier (Extension of Time) Act 1972|local|13|12-06-1972|An Act to extend the time for the commencement of the work authorised by the Whitley Bay Pier Act 1966; and for other purposes.}} |- | {{|Congregational Chapel and Trust Property Deptford Act 1972|local|14|12-06-1972|An Act to authorise the London Congregational Union (Incorporated) to dispose of the Congregational Chapel and Trust Property in High Street Deptford in the London Borough of Lewisham free from restrictions; to authorise the erection of buildings thereon; and for other purposes.}} |- | {{|Royal Bank of Scotland Limited Widows' and Orphans' Fund Order Confirmation Act 1972|local|15|29-06-1972|An Act to confirm a Provisional Order under the Private Legislation Procedure (Scotland) Act 1936, relating to the Royal Bank of Scotland Limited Widows' and Orphans' Fund.|po1=Royal Bank of Scotland Limited Widows' and Orphans' Fund Order 1972|Provisional Order to transfer the assets of the Royal Bank of Scotland Officers' Widows' Fund to the Trustees of The Royal Bank of Scotland Limited Widows' and Orphans' Fund and for purposes incidental to or consequential thereon.}} |- | {{|Mersey Tunnel Act 1972|local|16|29-06-1972|An Act to amend certain financial provisions of the Mersey Tunnel (Liverpool/Wallasey) &c. Act 1965 and the Mersey Tunnel (Liverpool/Wallasey) Act 1968; to amend the maximum amount of the fine which may be imposed for breach or non-observance of byelaws made under the said Act of 1965; and for other purposes.}} |- | {{|Seaham Harbour Dock Act 1972|local|17|29-06-1972|An Act to confer powers on the Seaham Harbour Dock Company in relation to the capital and management of their undertaking; to confer further powers on the Company; and for other purposes.}} |- | {{|United Reformed Church Act 1972|local|18|29-06-1972|An Act to make provision as to property held on behalf of the Congregational Church in England and Wales and its member churches and of the Presbyterian Church of England, and for other purposes incidental to or consequential upon the formation of the United Reformed Church (Congregational-Presbyterian) in England and Wales.}} |- | {{|Culag (Lochinver) Pier Order Confirmation Act 1972|local|19|27-07-1972|An Act to confirm a Provisional Order under the Private Legislation Procedure (Scotland) Act 1936, relating to Culag (Lochinver) Pier.|po1=Culag (Lochinver) Pier Order 1972|Provisional Order to authorise the County Council of Sutherland to carry out works for the extension and improvement of the Culag (Lochinver) Pier in the parish of Assynt in the county of Sutherland and to borrow money; and for other purposes.}} |- | {{|Stromness (Vehicle Ferry Terminal) Pier &c. Order Confirmation Act 1972|local|20|27-07-1972|An Act to confirm a Provisional Order under the Private Legislation Procedure (Scotland) Act 1936, relating to Stromness (Vehicle Ferry Terminal) Pier &c.|po1=Stromness (Vehicle Ferry Terminal) Pier &c. Order 1972|Provisional Order to authorise the Town Council of Stromness to carry out works for the improvement of the harbour of Stromness and to borrow money; and for other purposes.}} |- | {{|Railway Clearing System Superannuation Fund Act 1972|local|21|27-07-1972|An Act to empower the Railway Clearing System Superannuation Fund Corporation to transfer certain assets of the fund of that Corporation to Coras Iompair Eireann and the Northern Ireland Transport Holding Company in respect of certain contributing, non-contributing and superannuated members of that fund and for the cesser of membership of that fund of the persons having an interest in the transferred assets; and for other purposes.}} |- | {{|Bath Corporation Act 1972|local|22|27-07-1972|An Act to confer further powers on the mayor, aldermen and citizens of the city of Bath in relation to the finances of the city; to make further provision with regard to the improvement of the city; and for other purposes.}} |- | {{|Sunderland Corporation Act 1972|local|23|27-07-1972|maintained=y|An Act to transfer the undertaking of the River Wear Commissioners to the mayor, aldermen and burgesses of the borough of Sunderland; and for other purposes.}} |- | {{|Upper Avon Navigation Act 1972|local|24|27-07-1972|An Act to make provision for the conservancy of the navigation of the upper part of the river Avon in the counties of Warwick and Worcester; to confer powers upon the Upper Avon Navigation Trust Limited to regulate the use of such part of the river Avon by vessels; and for other purposes.}} |- | {{|Killingholme Generating Station (Ancillary Powers) Act 1972|local|25|27-07-1972|An Act to confer powers upon the Central Electricity Generating Board for the construction of ancillary works in connection with the proposed Killingholme Generating Station and for the acquisition of lands and easements for the purposes thereof or in connection therewith; and for other purposes.}} |- | {{|Westminster Abbey and Saint Margaret Westminster Act 1972|local|26|27-07-1972|An Act to provide for the division for ecclesiastical purposes between Westminster Abbey and the adjoining parishes of the parish of Saint Margaret Westminster and for the dissolution of that parish and its rectory; to provide for the vesting in the Dean and Chapter of Westminster of the church of Saint Margaret Westminster and certain other property held for its benefit and for the maintenance by the Dean and Chapter of that church and the services to be held therein; and for other purposes.}} |- | {{|Greater London Council (Money) Act 1972|local|27|27-07-1972|An Act to regulate the expenditure on capital account and on lending to other persons by the Greater London Council during the financial period from 1st April 1972 to 30th September 1973; and for other purposes.}} |- | {{|Cornwall River Authority Act 1972|local|28|27-07-1972|An Act to confer further powers on the Cornwall River Authority in relation to the acquisition of lands, and for other purposes.}} |- | {{|Coventry Corporation Act 1972|local|29|27-07-1972|An Act to confer further powers upon the lord mayor, aldermen and citizens of the city of Coventry; to make further provision with regard to the health, local government, welfare, improvement and finances of the city; and for other purposes.}} |- | {{|Devon County Council Act 1972|local|30|27-07-1972|An Act to confer further powers on the Devon County Council and on local and highway authorities in the administrative county of Devon in relation to lands, amenities, highways and public order and the local government, improvement, health and finances of the county; and for other purposes.}} |- | {{|Derby Corporation Act 1972|local|31|27-07-1972|An Act to confer further powers upon the mayor, aldermen and burgesses of the county borough of Derby; to make further provision with regard to the health, local government, welfare, improvement and finances of the borough; and for other purposes.}} |- | {{|Friends of the Clergy Corporation Act 1972|local|32|27-07-1972|An Act to amalgamate The Friend of the Clergy Corporation and The Poor Clergy Relief Corporation in a new corporate body; to define the objects and powers of the new incorporated body and to make provision with respect to the property and funds of the said Corporations; and for other purposes.}} |- | {{|Kensington and Chelsea Corporation Act 1972|local|33|27-07-1972|An Act to make further provision for the local government, health and improvement of the Royal borough of Kensington and Chelsea; and for other purposes.}} |- | {{|Oxford Corporation Act 1972|local|34|27-07-1972|An Act to confer further powers upon the lord mayor, aldermen and citizens of Oxford with regard to finance; and for other purposes.}} |- | {{|British Railways Act 1972|local|35|27-07-1972|An Act to empower the British Railways Board to construct a work and to acquire lands; to confer further powers on the Board; and for other purposes.}} |- | {{|Bath Side Bay Development Act 1972|local|36|09-08-1972|An Act to empower Earlpar Development Company Limited to construct and operate works at Bath Side Bay, Harwich; and for other purposes.}} |- | {{|British Transport Docks Act 1972|local|37|09-08-1972|An Act to confer further powers on the British Transport Docks Board for the regulation of navigation in the Humber and in relation to the Board's docks and harbours therein; to extend the limits of the docks and harbours of the Board at Barry, Cardiff and Southampton and confer further powers on the Board in relation thereto; to extend the time for the compulsory purchase of certain lands; and for other purposes.}} |- | {{|Devon River Authority (General Powers) Act 1972|local|38|09-08-1972|An Act to confer further powers on the Devon River Authority in relation to the acquisition of lands, and the administration of the area of the Authority; to make further provision with regard to the finances of the Authority and for the welfare of their staff; and for other purposes.}} |- | {{|Essex River Authority Act 1972|local|39|09-08-1972|An Act to abolish the internal drainage districts in the area of the Essex River Authority; to confer further powers on the Authority in relation to the acquisition of lands, the performance of their functions and the administration of their area; to make further provision with regard to the finances of the Authority and for the welfare of their staff; and for other purposes.}} |- | {{|Greater London Council (General Powers) Act 1972|local|40|09-08-1972|maintained=y|An Act to confer further powers upon the Greater London Council and other authorities; and for other purposes.}} |- | {{|Liverpool Corporation Act 1972|local|41|09-08-1972|An Act to confer further powers on the lord mayor, aldermen and citizens of the city of Liverpool in relation to taxicabs and private hire vehicles; to empower them to assist The Mersey Docks and Harbour Company; to amend certain agreements for the supply of water in bulk; to make further provision for the improvement, local government and finances of the city; and for other purposes.}} |- | {{|London Transport Act 1972|local|42|09-08-1972|An Act to empower the London Transport Executive to construct works and to acquire lands; to extend the time for the compulsory purchase of certain lands; to confer further powers on the Executive; and for other purposes.}} |- | {{|Milford Docks Act 1972|local|43|09-08-1972|An Act to confer further powers on the Milford Docks Company with regard to finance and administration; and for other purposes.}} |- | {{|Selnec (Manchester Central Area Railway, &c.) Act 1972|local|44|09-08-1972|An Act to empower the South East Lancashire and North East Cheshire Passenger Transport Executive and the British Railways Board to construct works and to acquire lands; and for other purposes.}} |- | {{|Thames Barrier and Flood Prevention Act 1972|local|45|09-08-1972|An Act to empower the Greater London Council to provide and operate a flood barrier, with movable gates, across the river Thames in Woolwich Reach, and in connection therewith to execute subsidiary works and to acquire lands; to confer further powers on the Greater London Council, the Essex River Authority and the Kent River Authority and other authorities; to amend certain enactments relating to flood prevention; and for other purposes.}} |- | {{|Thames Conservancy Act 1972|local|46|09-08-1972|maintained=y|An Act to amend the Thames Conservancy Acts and Orders 1932 to 1966; to confer further powers upon the Conservators of the river Thames in relation to their finances, the investment of their funds, the discharge of water, the protection of underground water and the acquisition of easements; and for other purposes.}} |- | {{|Hampshire County Council Act 1972|local|47|09-08-1972|An Act to confer further powers on the Hampshire County Council and local authorities in the administrative county of Hampshire in relation to the lands, development, amenities, highways and the local government, improvement, health and finances of the county; to make further provision for the superannuation of employees; and for other purposes.}} |- | {{|Dundee Extension Order Confirmation Act 1972|local|48|26-10-1972|An Act to confirm a Provisional Order under the Private Legislation Procedure (Scotland) Act 1936, relating to Dundee Extension.|po1=Dundee Extension Order 1972|Provisional Order to extend the boundaries of the city and royal burgh of Dundee; and for other purposes.}} |- | {{|Port Talbot Corporation Act 1972|local|49|26-10-1972|An Act to repeal or re-enact with amendments local enactments in force in the borough of Port Talbot; to enact provisions in relation to the lands, health, local government, markets, industry and finances of the borough; to confer further powers on the mayor, aldermen and burgesses of that borough; and for other purposes.}} |- | {{|West Sussex County Council Act 1972|local|50|26-10-1972|An Act to reconstitute the Littlehampton Harbour Board, to transfer functions of the board under the Land Drainage Acts to the Sussex River Authority and to make provision with respect to the finances and accounts of the board; to confer further powers on the West Sussex County Council and on local, highway and other authorities in the administrative county of West Sussex in relation to lands, planning and amenities, highways and the local government, improvement, health and finances of the county and of the boroughs and districts therein; to enable the bridge over the river Arun authorised by the Littlehampton Urban District Council (Arun Bridge) Act 1905 to be removed; and for other purposes.}} |- | {{|Anglesey Marine Terminal Act 1972|local|51|26-10-1972|An Act to provide for the vesting in the Anglesey County Council of the harbour undertaking of the Amlwch Urban District Council; to authorise the said county council and Shell U.K. Limited to construct works and acquire lands; to confer powers on the said county council with reference to the undertaking vested in them or authorised by this Act; and for other purposes.}} }}

== Personal act ==
{{legislationuk|act |- | {{|Wellington Estate Act 1972|personal|1|11-05-1972|An Act for enabling the Parliamentary Settlement of the Duke of Wellington to be terminated by the repeal of the Estate Acts; to provide for the Parliamentary Estate to be appropriated among the family; to provide for the establishment of new settlements and the powers and the duties of the respective trustees in connection with the property to be held on the new settlements; to provide for the retirement and the appointment of trustees; and for other purposes connected with that Settlement.}} }}
