= List of acts of the 2nd session of the 43rd Parliament of the United Kingdom =

This is a list of acts of the 2nd session of the 43rd Parliament of the United Kingdom, which ran from 9 November 1965 until 10 March 1966.

Acts passed since 1963 are cited by calendar year, as opposed to the convention used for earlier acts of citing the regnal year(s) in which the relevant parliamentary session was held. Each act passed in a respective year is given a chapter number (abbreviated "c."), denoted by Arabic numerals in the case of public general acts, lowercase Roman numerals in the case of local acts, or italicised Arabic numerals in the case of personal acts. These run as separate series.

27 acts of Parliament were passed by the 43rd Parliament in its 2nd session: 21 public general acts and 6 local acts.

indicates that an act is available to view at legislation.gov.uk, and indicates the location of the original act in the Parliamentary Archives.

== Public general acts ==
{{legislationuk|act |- | {{|Southern Rhodesia Act 1965|public|76|15-11-1965|maintained=y|An Act to make further provision with respect to Southern Rhodesia.}} |- | {{|Expiring Laws Continuance Act 1965|public|77|22-12-1965|An Act to continue certain expiring laws.}} |- | {{|Pensions (Increase) Act 1965|public|78|22-12-1965|An Act to make provision with respect to increases or supplements in respect of certain pensions.}} |- | {{|Workmen's Compensation and Benefit (Amendment) Act 1965|public|79|22-12-1965|An Act to amend the law with respect to the supplementation of workmen's compensation and the provision of other benefit in respect of employment before 5th July 1948.}} |- | {{|Rural Water Supplies and Sewerage Act 1965|public|80|22-12-1965|An Act to increase the limit on the contributions out of moneys provided by Parliament which may be made under section 1 of the Rural Water Supplies and Sewerage Act 1944.}} |- | {{|Housing (Slum Clearance Compensation) Act 1965|public|81|22-12-1965|An Act to amend the provisions of Part II of Schedule 2 to the Housing Act 1957 relating to private dwellings.}} |- | {{|Coal Industry Act 1965|public|82|22-12-1965|maintained=y|An Act to make provision with respect to borrowing by, and loans by the Minister of Power to, the National Coal Board; with respect to the capital reconstruction, and the application of certain funds, of that Board; for the making of grants with the object of accelerating the redeployment of the manpower resources of that Board and the elimination of uneconomic colliery capacity; with respect to pensions or compensation for certain persons who have been members of that Board; and for connected purposes.}} |- | {{|Teachers' Superannuation Act 1965|public|83|22-12-1965|An Act to amend the law relating to the superannuation and other benefits payable to or in respect of teachers and certain other persons employed in connection with the provision of educational services, and for purposes connected therewith.}} |- | {{|Consolidated Fund Act 1966|public|1|24-02-1966|An Act to apply a sum out of the Consolidated Fund to the service of the year ending on 31st March 1966.}} |- | {{|Church of England Convocations Act 1966|public|2|24-02-1966|maintained=y|An Act to make further provision with respect to the duration of the Convocations of the provinces of Canterbury and York.}} |- | {{|Appropriation Act 1966|public|3|10-03-1966|An Act to apply certain sums out of the Consolidated Fund to the service of the years ending on 31st March 1965, 1966 and 1967, and to appropriate the supplies granted in this Session of Parliament.}} |- | {{|Mines (Working Facilities and Support) Act 1966|public|4|10-03-1966|maintained=y|An Act to consolidate Part I of the Mines (Working Facilities and Support) Act 1923 and certain enactments amending the said Part I.}} |- | {{|Statute Law Revision Act 1966|public|5|10-03-1966|An Act to revise the statute law by repealing obsolete, spent, unnecessary or superseded enactments.}} |- | {{|National Insurance Act 1966|public|6|10-03-1966|An Act to make provision for the payment under the National Insurance Act 1965 of earnings-related benefit by way of increases of unemployment benefit, sickness benefit and widow's allowance; to make other amendments of that Act and of the National Insurance (Industrial Injuries) Act 1965; and for connected purposes.}} |- | {{|Local Government (Pecuniary Interests) (Scotland) Act 1966|public|7|10-03-1966|An Act to amend sections 73 and 102 of the Local Government (Scotland) Act 1947.}} |- | {{|National Health Service Act 1966|public|8|10-03-1966|maintained=y|An Act to facilitate the financing of premises and equipment used by practitioners providing general medical services; to modify the prohibition of full-time salaries for practitioners providing general medical services; and for purposes connected therewith.}} |- | {{|Rating Act 1966|public|9|10-03-1966|An Act to make provision for the payment by instalments of rates on dwellings and for the granting of rebates in respect of such rates; and for connected purposes.}} |- | {{|Commonwealth Secretariat Act 1966|public|10|10-03-1966|maintained=y|An Act to make provision with respect to the Commonwealth Secretariat; and for connected purposes.}} |- | {{|Air Corporations Act 1966|public|11|10-03-1966|maintained=y|An Act to provide for the capital reconstruction of the British Overseas Airways Corporation; to provide for Exchequer investment in that Corporation otherwise than by way of loan; to amend the financial duties and borrowing powers of that Corporation and of the British European Airways Corporation; to enable the Treasury to guarantee foreign currency debts of those Corporations; and to amend sections 21 and 23 of, and paragraphs 9 and 10 of Schedule 1 to, the Air Corporations Act 1949.}} |- | {{|Post Office Savings Bank Act 1966|public|12|10-03-1966|An Act to enable deposits in a post office savings bank to be received for investment in securities, and at rates of interest, other than those authorised by the Post Office Savings Bank Act 1954; to amend the provisions of that Act as to the making and receipt of deposits; and for purposes connected with those matters.}} |- | {{|Universities (Scotland) Act 1966|public|13|10-03-1966|maintained=y|An Act to amend the law relating to the Universities of St. Andrews, Glasgow, Aberdeen and Edinburgh; to make provisions consequential on the foundation of a University of Dundee; and for purposes connected therewith.}} }}

== Local acts ==
{{legislationuk|act |- | {{|Corporation of the Trinity House of Leith Order Confirmation Act 1965|local|43|22-12-1965|An Act to confirm a Provisional Order under the Private Legislation Procedure (Scotland) Act 1936, relating to the Corporation of the Trinity House of Leith.|po1=Corporation of the Trinity House of Leith Order 1965|Provisional Order to change the name of the Corporation of the Master and Assistants of the Trinity House of Leith to the Corporation of the Trinity House of Leith; to reconstitute and confer new powers upon the Corporation; and for other purposes.}} |- | {{|Clyde Navigation (Superannuation) Order Confirmation Act 1965|local|44|22-12-1965|An Act to confirm a Provisional Order under the Private Legislation Procedure (Scotland) Act 1936, relating to Clyde Navigation (Superannuation).|po1=Clyde Navigation (Superannuation) Order 1965|Provisional Order to amend the provisions of the Clyde Navigation (Superannuation) Order, 1908, the Clyde Navigation Act, 1929, the Clyde Navigation (Superannuation) Order, 1949, the Clyde Navigation (Superannuation) Order, 1955, and the Clyde Navigation Order, 1964, relating to the superannuation fund for the officers and servants of the Trustees of the Clyde Navigation and for other purposes.}} |- | {{|Clyde Port Authority Order Confirmation Act 1965|local|45|22-12-1965|An Act to confirm a Provisional Order under the Private Legislation Procedure (Scotland) Act 1936, relating to the Clyde Port Authority.|po1=Clyde Port Authority Order 1965|Provisional Order to incorporate the Clyde Port Authority; to transfer to that Authority the undertakings of the Trustees of the Clyde Navigation, the Trustees of the Port and Harbours of Greenock and the Trustees of the Clyde Lighthouses, to confer powers on that Authority and for other purposes.}} |- | {{|Glasgow Corporation (No. 2) Order Confirmation Act 1965|local|46|22-12-1965|An Act to confirm a Provisional Order under the Private Legislation Procedure (Scotland) Act 1936, relating to Glasgow Corporation.|po1=Glasgow Corporation (No. 2) Order 1965|Provisional Order to confer further powers on the Corporation of the city of Glasgow with respect to their tunnels under the river Clyde between Linthouse and Whiteinch; to extend the time for the acquisition of lands for the construction of certain sewers; to confer further powers on the Corporation with respect to the acquisition of lands, the investment of their superannuation fund, the administration of the city and for other purposes.}} |- | {{|Heriot-Watt College Order Confirmation Act 1965|local|47|22-12-1965|An Act to confirm a Provisional Order under the Private Legislation Procedure (Scotland) Act 1936, relating to Heriot-Watt College.|po1=Heriot-Watt College Order 1965|Provisional Order to make provision, in the event of Her Majesty granting a Royal Charter for the constitution and founding of a University in or in the vicinity of the city of Edinburgh, for the transfer to the said University of the superannuation fund of the Governors of Heriot-Watt College and as to the superannuation of certain officers and servants of the said Governors (including former officers and servants); as to legacies and other bequests in favour of the said Governors or the said College; and for purposes connected with the matters aforesaid.}} |- | {{|Covent Garden Market Act 1966|local|1|10-03-1966|An Act to make provision for the transfer of Covent Garden Market to a site in the London boroughs of Lambeth and Wandsworth; to empower the Covent Garden Market Authority to acquire lands and easements for that and other purposes; to confer further powers on that Authority; to amend the provisions of the Covent Garden Market Act 1961; and for other purposes.}} }}
