= List of acts of the 4th session of the 51st Parliament of the United Kingdom =

This is a list of acts of the 4th session of the 51st Parliament of the United Kingdom, which ran from 15 November 1995 until 17 October 1996.

Acts passed since 1963 are cited by calendar year, as opposed to the convention used for earlier acts of citing the regnal year(s) in which the relevant parliamentary session was held. Each act passed in a respective year is given a chapter number (abbreviated "c."), denoted by Arabic numerals in the case of public general acts, lowercase Roman numerals in the case of local acts, or italicised Arabic numerals in the case of personal acts. These run as separate series.

70 acts of Parliament were passed by the 51st Parliament in its 4th session: 60 public general acts and 10 local acts.

indicates that an act is available to view at legislation.gov.uk, and indicates the location of the original act in the Parliamentary Archives.

== Public general acts ==
{{legislationuk|act |- | {{|Consolidated Fund (No. 2) Act 1995|public|54|19-12-1995|maintained=y|An Act to apply certain sums out of the Consolidated Fund to the service of the years ending on 31st March 1996 and 1997.}} |- | {{|Humber Bridge (Debts) Act 1996|public|1|29-02-1996|maintained=y|An Act to confer power on the Secretary of State to provide that sums payable to him by the Humber Bridge Board shall not be so payable.}} |- | {{|Hong Kong (Overseas Public Servants) Act 1996|public|2|29-02-1996|maintained=y|An Act to confer power to make provision for the making of payments to, and to permit early retirement by, certain Hong Kong overseas public servants; to authorise the provision of resettlement services to certain Hong Kong overseas public servants who retire early; and to confer power to make provision for the making in certain circumstances of payments to supplement pensions and gratuities paid to or in respect of retired overseas public servants in respect of service in Hong Kong.}} |- | {{|Wild Mammals (Protection) Act 1996|public|3|29-02-1996|maintained=y|An Act to make provision for the protection of wild mammals from certain cruel acts; and for connected purposes.}} |- | {{|Consolidated Fund Act 1996|public|4|21-03-1996|maintained=y|An Act to apply certain sums out of the Consolidated Fund to the service of the years ending on 31st March 1995 and 1996.}} |- | {{|Health Service Commissioners (Amendment) Act 1996|public|5|21-03-1996|maintained=y|An Act to make provision about the Health Service Commissioners.}} |- | {{|Chemical Weapons Act 1996|public|6|03-04-1996|maintained=y|An Act to promote the control of chemical weapons and of certain toxic chemicals and precursors; and for connected purposes.}} |- | {{|Prevention of Terrorism (Additional Powers) Act 1996|public|7|03-04-1996|maintained=y|An Act to extend powers of search in connection with acts of terrorism and terrorist investigations; confer powers on constables in relation to areas on which police cordons are imposed in connection with terrorist investigations; and confer powers in connection with the prevention of acts of terrorism to impose prohibitions and restrictions in relation to vehicles on roads.}} |- | {{|Finance Act 1996|public|8|29-04-1996|maintained=y|An Act to grant certain duties, to alter other duties, and to amend the law relating to the National Debt and the Public Revenue, and to make further provision in connection with Finance.}} |- | {{|Education (Student Loans) Act 1996|public|9|29-04-1996|maintained=y|An Act to make provision for, and in consequence of, the payment of subsidy in respect of private sector student loans.}} |- | {{|Audit (Miscellaneous Provisions) Act 1996|public|10|29-04-1996|maintained=y|An Act to extend the functions of the Audit Commission for Local Authorities and the National Health Service in England and Wales; to alter the financial year of that Commission and of the Accounts Commission for Scotland; to make provision about the manner of publication of certain information required to be published in pursuance of a direction of either Commission; and to repeal paragraph 5(4) of Schedule 3 to the Local Government Finance Act 1982.}} |- | {{|Northern Ireland (Entry to Negotiations, etc) Act 1996|public|11|29-04-1996|maintained=y|An Act to make provision for elections in Northern Ireland for the purpose of providing delegates from among whom participants in negotiations may be drawn; for a forum constituted by those delegates; for referendums in Northern Ireland; and for connected purposes.}} |- | {{|Rating (Caravans and Boats) Act 1996|public|12|29-04-1996|maintained=y|An Act to make provision about liability for non-domestic rates in England and Wales in relation to certain caravans and boats.}} |- | {{|Non-Domestic Rating (Information) Act 1996|public|13|22-05-1996|maintained=y|An Act to make provision for and in connection with the disclosure by persons who are valuation officers or assessors to other such persons of information connected with non-domestic rating.}} |- | {{|Reserve Forces Act 1996|public|14|22-05-1996|maintained=y|An Act to make provision with respect to the reserve forces of the Crown and persons liable to be recalled for permanent service; to amend the provisions of the Reserve Forces Act 1980 relating to the lieutenancies; to amend the law relating to the postponement of the discharge or transfer to the reserve of regular servicemen; and for connected purposes.}} |- | {{|National Health Service (Residual Liabilities) Act 1996|public|15|22-05-1996|maintained=y|An Act to make provision with respect to the transfer of liabilities of certain National Health Service bodies in the event of their ceasing to exist.}} |- | {{|Police Act 1996|public|16|22-05-1996|maintained=y|An Act to consolidate the Police Act 1964, Part IX of the Police and Criminal Evidence Act 1984, Chapter I of Part I of the Police and Magistrates' Courts Act 1994 and certain other enactments relating to the police.}} |- | {{|Employment Tribunals Act 1996|note1= (Note: The original short title of the Employment Tribunals Act 1996 was the Industrial Tribunals Act 1996, but this was amended by the Employment Rights (Dispute Resolution) Act 1998 on 1 August 1998. At the same time, the term "industrial tribunals" in the long title was amended to "employment tribunals".)|public|17|22-05-1996|maintained=y|An Act to consolidate enactments relating to employment tribunals and the Employment Appeal Tribunal.}} |- | {{|Employment Rights Act 1996|public|18|22-05-1996|maintained=y|An Act to consolidate enactments relating to employment rights.}} |- | {{|Law Reform (Year and a Day Rule) Act 1996|public|19|17-06-1996|maintained=y|An Act to abolish the "year and a day rule" and, in consequence of its abolition, to impose a restriction on the institution in certain circumstances of proceedings for a fatal offence.}} |- | {{|Dogs (Fouling of Land) Act 1996|public|20|17-06-1996|maintained=y|An Act to make provision with respect to the fouling of land by dogs.}} |- | {{|London Regional Transport Act 1996|public|21|17-06-1996|maintained=y|An Act to extend, and facilitate the exercise of, the powers of London Regional Transport to enter into and carry out agreements; and for connected purposes.}} |- | {{|Northern Ireland (Emergency Provisions) Act 1996|public|22|17-06-1996|maintained=y|An Act to re-enact, with omissions and amendments, the Northern Ireland (Emergency Provisions) Act 1991; and for connected purposes.}} |- | {{|Arbitration Act 1996|public|23|17-06-1996|maintained=y|An Act to restate and improve the law relating to arbitration pursuant to an arbitration agreement; to make other provision relating to arbitration and arbitration awards; and for connected purposes.}} |- | {{|Treasure Act 1996|public|24|04-07-1996|maintained=y|An Act to abolish treasure trove and to make fresh provision in relation to treasure.}} |- | {{|Criminal Procedure and Investigations Act 1996|public|25|04-07-1996|maintained=y|An Act to make provision about criminal procedure and criminal investigations.}} |- | {{|Offensive Weapons Act 1996|public|26|04-07-1996|maintained=y|An Act to make provision about persons having knives, other articles which have a blade or are sharply pointed or offensive weapons; and about selling knives or such articles to persons under the age of sixteen years.}} |- | {{|Family Law Act 1996|public|27|04-07-1996|maintained=y|An Act to make provision with respect to: divorce and separation; legal aid in connection with mediation in disputes relating to family matters; proceedings in cases where marriages have broken down; rights of occupation of certain domestic premises; prevention of molestation; the inclusion in certain orders under the Children Act 1989 of provisions about the occupation of a dwelling-house; the transfer of tenancies between spouses and persons who have lived together as husband and wife; and for connected purposes.}} |- | {{|Commonwealth Development Corporation Act 1996|public|28|04-07-1996|maintained=y|An Act to amend section 2 of the Commonwealth Development Corporation Act 1978 to confer further powers on the Commonwealth Development Corporation; and for connected purposes.}} |- | {{|Sexual Offences (Conspiracy and Incitement) Act 1996|public|29|04-07-1996|maintained=y|An Act to make provision about conspiracy, or incitement, to commit certain sexual acts outside the United Kingdom.}} |- | {{|Community Care (Direct Payments) Act 1996|public|30|04-07-1996|maintained=y|An Act to enable local authorities responsible for community care services to make payments to persons in respect of their securing the provision of such services; and for connected purposes.}} |- | {{|Defamation Act 1996|public|31|04-07-1996|maintained=y|An Act to amend the law of defamation and to amend the law of limitation with respect to actions for defamation or malicious falsehood.}} |- | {{|Trading Schemes Act 1996|public|32|04-07-1996|maintained=y|An Act to make provision in respect of certain trading schemes; and for connected purposes.}} |- | {{|Prisoners' Earnings Act 1996|public|33|18-07-1996|maintained=y|An Act to authorise deductions from or levies on prisoners' earnings; to provide for the application of such deductions or levies; and for connected purposes.}} |- | {{|Marriage Ceremony (Prescribed Words) Act 1996|public|34|18-07-1996|maintained=y|An Act to provide alternatives for the declaration and words of contract prescribed by law for marriage ceremonies in registered buildings and register offices, on approved premises and in certain other circumstances.}} |- | {{|Security Service Act 1996|public|35|18-07-1996|maintained=y|An Act to give the Security Service the function of acting in support of the prevention and detection of serious crime, and for connected purposes.}} |- | {{|Licensing (Amendment) (Scotland) Act 1996|public|36|18-07-1996|maintained=y|An Act to amend the Licensing (Scotland) Act 1976 to require licensing boards to attach to licences conditions relating to certain events involving music and dancing and to make new provision for the composition of licensing boards for licensing divisions.}} |- | {{|Noise Act 1996|public|37|18-07-1996|maintained=y|An Act to make provision about noise emitted from dwellings at night; about the forfeiture and confiscation of equipment used to make noise unlawfully; and for connected purposes.}} |- | {{|Energy Conservation Act 1996|public|38|18-07-1996|maintained=y|An Act to make further provisions for energy conservation; and for related purposes.}} |- | {{|Civil Aviation (Amendment) Act 1996|public|39|18-07-1996|maintained=y|An Act to amend the Civil Aviation Act 1982 so as to provide for the prosecution of persons committing offences on foreign aircraft while in flight to the United Kingdom; and for connected purposes.}} |- | {{|Party Wall etc. Act 1996|public|40|18-07-1996|maintained=y|An Act to make provision in respect of party walls, and excavation and construction in proximity to certain buildings or structures; and for connected purposes.}} |- | {{|Hong Kong (War Wives and Widows) Act 1996|public|41|18-07-1996|maintained=y|An Act to provide for the acquisition of British citizenship by certain women who are Hong Kong residents.}} |- | {{|Railway Heritage Act 1996|public|42|18-07-1996|maintained=y|An Act to make further provision for and in connection with the preservation of railway records and artefacts.}} |- | {{|Education (Scotland) Act 1996|public|43|18-07-1996|maintained=y|An Act to provide for the establishment of a body corporate to be known as the Scottish Qualifications Authority; to provide for the transfer of functions, property, rights, liabilities, obligations and staff to that body and for the conferring of other functions on it; to make provision enabling payment of grant to providers of education for children under school age; to amend certain legislation relating to school education in Scotland; and for connected purposes.}} |- | {{|Deer (Amendment) (Scotland) Act 1996|public|44|18-07-1996|maintained=y|An Act to amend the Deer (Scotland) Act 1959; and for connected purposes.}} |- | {{|Appropriation Act 1996|public|45|24-07-1996|maintained=y|An Act to apply a sum out of the Consolidated Fund to the service of the year ending on 31st March 1997; to appropriate the supplies granted in this Session of Parliament; and to repeal certain Consolidated Fund and Appropriation Acts.}} |- | {{|Armed Forces Act 1996|public|46|24-07-1996|maintained=y|An Act to continue the Army Act 1955, the Air Force Act 1955 and the Naval Discipline Act 1957; to amend those Acts and other enactments relating to the armed forces; to make further provision in relation to proceedings before service courts; to provide for the taking of fingerprints and samples from offenders convicted in service proceedings; to amend the Courts-Martial (Appeals) Act 1968; to make further provision in relation to complaints to industrial tribunals by members of the armed forces; to provide for further exemptions from the Firearms Act 1968; to make further provision in relation to Greenwich Hospital; to amend the Visiting Forces Act 1952; and for connected purposes.}} |- | {{|Trusts of Land and Appointment of Trustees Act 1996|public|47|24-07-1996|maintained=y|An Act to make new provision about trusts of land including provision phasing out the Settled Land Act 1925, abolishing the doctrine of conversion and otherwise amending the law about trusts for sale of land; to amend the law about the appointment and retirement of trustees of any trust; and for connected purposes.}} |- | {{|Damages Act 1996|public|48|24-07-1996|maintained=y|An Act to make new provision in relation to damages for personal injury, including injury resulting in death.}} |- | {{|Asylum and Immigration Act 1996|public|49|24-07-1996|maintained=y|An Act to amend and supplement the Immigration Act 1971 and the Asylum and Immigration Appeals Act 1993; to make further provision with respect to persons subject to immigration control and the employment of such persons; and for connected purposes.}} |- | {{|Nursery Education and Grant-Maintained Schools Act 1996|public|50|24-07-1996|maintained=y|An Act to provide for the making of grants in respect of nursery education and to permit borrowing by grant-maintained schools.}} |- | {{|Social Security (Overpayments) Act 1996|public|51|24-07-1996|maintained=y|An Act to amend section 71 of the Social Security Administration Act 1992 and section 69 of the Social Security Administration (Northern Ireland) Act 1992.}} |- | {{|Housing Act 1996|public|52|24-07-1996|maintained=y|An Act to make provision about housing, including provision about the social rented sector, houses in multiple occupation, landlord and tenant matters, the administration of housing benefit, the conduct of tenants, the allocation of housing accommodation by local housing authorities and homelessness; and for connected purposes.}} |- | {{|Housing Grants, Construction and Regeneration Act 1996|public|53|24-07-1996|maintained=y|An Act to make provision for grants and other assistance for housing purposes and about action in relation to unfit housing; to amend the law relating to construction contracts and architects; to provide grants and other assistance for regeneration and development and in connection with clearance areas; to amend the provisions relating to home energy efficiency schemes; to make provision in connection with the dissolution of urban development corporations, housing action trusts and the Commission for the New Towns; and for connected purposes.}} |- | {{|Statutory Instruments (Production and Sale) Act 1996|public|54|24-07-1996|maintained=y|An Act to make provision (with retrospective effect) for the printing and sale of statutory instruments under the authority of the Queen's printer, for their issue under the authority of Her Majesty's Stationery Office and for the reception in evidence of lists of such instruments which do not bear the imprint of the Queen's printer.}} |- | {{|Broadcasting Act 1996|public|55|24-07-1996|maintained=y|An Act to make new provision about the broadcasting in digital form of television and sound programme services and the broadcasting in that form on television or radio frequencies of other services; to amend the Broadcasting Act 1990; to make provision about rights to televise sporting or other events of national interest; to amend in other respects the law relating to the provision of television and sound programme services; to provide for the establishment and functions of a Broadcasting Standards Commission and for the dissolution of the Broadcasting Complaints Commission and the Broadcasting Standards Council; to make provision for the transfer to other persons of property, rights and liabilities of the British Broadcasting Corporation relating to their transmission network; and for connected purposes.}} |- | {{|Education Act 1996|public|56|24-07-1996|maintained=y|An Act to consolidate the Education Act 1944 and certain other enactments relating to education, with amendments to give effect to recommendations of the Law Commission.}} |- | {{|School Inspections Act 1996|public|57|24-07-1996|maintained=y|An Act to consolidate provisions of the Education (Schools) Act 1992 and Part V of the Education Act 1993, with amendments to give effect to recommendations of the Law Commission.}} |- | {{|Deer (Scotland) Act 1996|public|58|24-07-1996|maintained=y|An Act to consolidate the legislation relating to deer in Scotland.}} |- | {{|Public Order (Amendment) Act 1996|public|59|17-10-1996|maintained=y|An Act to amend the power of arrest of section 5 of the Public Order Act 1986.}} }}

== Local acts ==
{{legislationuk|act |- | {{|Church of Scotland (Property and Endowments) Amendment Order Confirmation Act 1995|local|11|19-12-1995|maintained=y|An Act to confirm a Provisional Order under the Private Legislation Procedure (Scotland) Act 1936, relating to Church of Scotland (Property and Endowments) Amendment.|po1=Church of Scotland (Property and Endowments) Amendment Order 1995|Provisional Order to amend the Church of Scotland (Property and Endowments) Act 1925 and the Church of Scotland (Property and Endowments) Amendment Act 1933, and to modify the effect of certain Orders made under the Churches (Scotland) Act 1905, so as to increase the discretionary powers of the General Assembly of the Church of Scotland in relation to certain property and endowments of the Church.}} |- | {{|Edinburgh Assay Office Order Confirmation Act 1996|local|1|29-02-1996|maintained=y|An Act to confirm a Provisional Order under the Private Legislation Procedure (Scotland) Act 1936, relating to Edinburgh Assay Office.|po1=Edinburgh Assay Office Order 1996|Provisional Order to amend section 16 of the Hallmarking Act 1973 in its application to the Edinburgh Assay Office; to extend the functions of the Office; and for other purposes incidental thereto.}} |- | {{|Australia and New Zealand Banking Group Act 1996|local|2|17-06-1996|maintained=y|An Act to provide for the registration of ANZ Holdings (UK) plc and ANZ Grindlays Bank plc as companies incorporated in the State of Victoria in the Commonwealth of Australia; for the cesser of application to those companies of the Companies Act 1985, consequent upon such registration; for the transfer to and vesting in Australia and New Zealand Banking Group Limited of the whole or parts of the undertakings in the United Kingdom of ANZ Grindlays Bank plc, National & Grindlays Bank Limited and ANZ Grindlays Executor & Trustee Company Limited; and for connected purposes.}} |- | {{|University College London Act 1996|local|3|04-07-1996|maintained=y|An Act to unite the Royal Free Hospital School of Medicine, the Institute of Neurology (Queen Square) and The Institute of Child Health with University College London; to transfer all rights, properties and liabilities from the said school and institutes to the said college; and for connected and other purposes.}} |- | {{|City of London (Approved Premises for Marriage) Act 1996|local|4|18-07-1996|maintained=y|An Act to enable the approval of premises within the City of London (including the Temples) for the solemnization of civil marriages; and for connected purposes.}} |- | {{|Henry Johnson, Sons & Co., Limited Act 1996|local|5|18-07-1996|maintained=y|An Act to make provision for the transfer to the Republic of France of the incorporation of Henry Johnson, Sons & Co., Limited; for the cesser of application to the company of provisions of the Companies Act 1985; and for the purposes incidental thereto.}} |- | {{|Belfast Charitable Society Act 1996|local|6|18-07-1996|maintained=y|An Act to make provision as to the objects, powers, constitution and management of the Belfast Charitable Society; and for connected purposes.}} |- | {{|Allied Irish Banks Act 1996|local|7|24-07-1996|maintained=y|An Act to provide for the transfer to AIB Group Northern Ireland plc of part of the undertakings of Allied Irish Banks, p.l.c., AIB Capital Markets plc and AIB Finance Limited; and for related purposes.}} |- | {{|City of Westminster Act 1996|local|8|24-07-1996|maintained=y|An Act to make further provision for the control of unlicensed sex establishments in the City of Westminster.}} |- | {{|London Local Authorities Act 1996|local|9|17-10-1996|maintained=y|An Act to confer further powers upon local authorities in London; and for related purposes.}} }}
