= List of acts of the 1st session of the 51st Parliament of the United Kingdom =

This is a list of acts of the 1st session of the 51st Parliament of the United Kingdom, which ran from 27 April 1992 until 5 November 1993.

Acts passed since 1963 are cited by calendar year, as opposed to the convention used for earlier acts of citing the regnal year(s) in which the relevant parliamentary session was held. Each act passed in a respective year is given a chapter number (abbreviated "c."), denoted by Arabic numerals in the case of public general acts, lowercase Roman numerals in the case of local acts, or italicised Arabic numerals in the case of personal acts. These run as separate series.

99 acts of Parliament were passed by the 51st Parliament in its 1st session: 68 public general acts and 31 local acts.

indicates that an act is available to view at legislation.gov.uk, and indicates the location of the original act in the Parliamentary Archives.

== Public general acts ==
{{legislationuk|act |- | {{|Mauritius Republic Act 1992|public|45|18-06-1992|maintained=y|An Act to make provision in connection with Mauritius becoming a republic within the Commonwealth.}} |- | {{|Non-Domestic Rating Act 1992|public|46|18-06-1992|maintained=y|An Act to make further provision with respect to non-domestic rating for the period beginning with 11th March 1992 and ending with 31st March 1995; and for connected purposes.}} |- | {{|Appropriation (No. 2) Act 1992|public|47|16-07-1992|maintained=y|An Act to apply certain sums out of the Consolidated Fund to the service of the year ending on 31st March 1993 and to appropriate the supplies granted in this Session of Parliament.}} |- | {{|Finance (No. 2) Act 1992|public|48|16-07-1992|maintained=y|An Act to grant certain duties, to alter other duties, and to amend the law relating to the National Debt and the Public Revenue, and to make further provision in connection with Finance.}} |- | {{|Community Care (Residential Accommodation) Act 1992|public|49|16-07-1992|maintained=y|An Act to make further provision with respect to the making of arrangements under section 21 of the National Assistance Act 1948 for the provision of residential accommodation in premises managed by persons other than local authorities.}} |- | {{|Carriage of Goods by Sea Act 1992|public|50|16-07-1992|maintained=y|An Act to replace the Bills of Lading Act 1855 with new provision with respect to bills of lading and certain other shipping documents.}} |- | {{|Protection of Badgers Act 1992|public|51|16-07-1992|maintained=y|An Act to consolidate the Badgers Act 1973, the Badgers Act 1991 and the Badgers (Further Protection) Act 1991.}} |- | {{|Trade Union and Labour Relations (Consolidation) Act 1992|public|52|16-07-1992|maintained=y|An Act to consolidate the enactments relating to collective labour relations, that is to say, to trade unions, employers' associations, industrial relations and industrial action.}} |- | {{|Tribunals and Inquiries Act 1992|public|53|16-07-1992|maintained=y|An Act to consolidate the Tribunals and Inquiries Act 1971 and certain other enactments relating to tribunals and inquiries.}} |- | {{|Human Fertilisation and Embryology (Disclosure of Information) Act 1992|public|54|16-07-1992|maintained=y|An Act to relax the restrictions on the disclosure of information imposed by section 33(5) of the Human Fertilisation and Embryology Act 1990.}} |- | {{|Boundary Commissions Act 1992|public|55|12-11-1992|maintained=y|An Act to make further provision with respect to the membership of the Boundary Commissions, the timing of their reports and the local government boundaries of which account is to be taken in their reports.}} |- | {{|Maintenance Orders (Reciprocal Enforcement) Act 1992|public|56|12-11-1992|maintained=y|An Act to amend the Maintenance Orders (Facilities for Enforcement) Act 1920 and the Maintenance Orders (Reciprocal Enforcement) Act 1972; and for connected purposes.}} |- | {{|Sporting Events (Control of Alcohol etc.) (Amendment) Act 1992|public|57|03-12-1992|maintained=y|An Act to extend the maximum period for which an order under section 3 of the Sporting Events (Control of Alcohol etc.) Act 1985 may remain in force.}} |- | {{|Car Tax (Abolition) Act 1992|public|58|03-12-1992|maintained=y|An Act to abolish car tax.}} |- | {{|Consolidated Fund (No. 3) Act 1992|public|59|17-12-1992|maintained=y|An Act to apply certain sums out of the Consolidated Fund to the service of the years ending on 31st March 1993 and 1994.}} |- | {{|Sea Fish (Conservation) Act 1992|public|60|17-12-1992|maintained=y|An Act to amend the law relating to licences under sections 4 and 4A of the Sea Fish (Conservation) Act 1967.}} |- | {{|Civil Service (Management Functions) Act 1992|public|61|17-12-1992|maintained=y|An Act to make provision with respect to functions relating to the management of Her Majesty's Home Civil Service; and to make provision about parliamentary procedure in relation to legislation for Northern Ireland making corresponding provision with respect to the Northern Ireland Civil Service.}} |- | {{|Gas (Exempt Supplies) Act 1993|public|1|19-01-1993|maintained=y|An Act to amend section 5 of the Gas Act 1986; and for connected purposes.}} |- | {{|British Coal and British Rail (Transfer Proposals) Act 1993|public|2|19-01-1993|maintained=y|An Act to confer powers on the British Coal Corporation and the British Railways Board to act in relation to proposals for the transfer of any of their functions, property, rights or liabilities to any other body or person; and for connected purposes.}} |- | {{|Social Security Act 1993|public|3|29-01-1993|maintained=y|An Act to amend sections 3 and 85 of the Social Security Act 1986, to provide for the making of certain payments into the National Insurance Fund, and for connected purposes.}} |- | {{|Consolidated Fund Act 1993|public|4|18-02-1993|maintained=y|An Act to apply certain sums out of the Consolidated Fund to the service of the year ending on 31st March 1993.}} |- | {{|Damages (Scotland) Act 1993|public|5|18-02-1993|maintained=y|An Act to clarify and amend the law of Scotland concerning the right of certain relatives of a deceased person, and the right of executors, to claim damages in respect of the death of the deceased from personal injuries; to make provision regarding solatium where personal injuries result in loss of expectation of life; and for connected purposes.}} |- | {{|Bankruptcy (Scotland) Act 1993|public|6|18-02-1993|maintained=y|An Act to amend the Bankruptcy (Scotland) Act 1985; and for connected purposes.}} |- | {{|Consolidated Fund (No. 2) Act 1993|public|7|29-03-1993|maintained=y|An Act to apply certain sums out of the Consolidated Fund to the service of the years ending on 31st March 1992 and 1993.}} |- | {{|Judicial Pensions and Retirement Act 1993|public|8|29-03-1993|maintained=y|An Act to make further provision with respect to the pensions and other benefits payable in respect of service in certain judicial, and related, offices and in certain senior public investigative offices; to amend the law relating to the date on which the holders of certain judicial, and related, offices are required to vacate those offices; and for purposes connected therewith.}} |- | {{|Prisoners and Criminal Proceedings (Scotland) Act 1993|public|9|29-03-1993|maintained=y|An Act to amend the law of Scotland with respect to the detention, transfer and release of persons serving sentences of imprisonment etc. or committed or remanded in custody; to make further provision as regards evidence and procedure in criminal proceedings in Scotland; and for connected purposes.}} |- | {{|Charities Act 1993|public|10|27-05-1993|maintained=y|An Act to consolidate the Charitable Trustees Incorporation Act 1872 and, except for certain spent or transitional provisions, the Charities Act 1960 and Part I of the Charities Act 1992.}} |- | {{|Clean Air Act 1993|public|11|27-05-1993|maintained=y|An Act to consolidate the Clean Air Acts 1956 and 1968 and certain related enactments, with amendments to give effect to recommendations of the Law Commission and the Scottish Law Commission.}} |- | {{|Radioactive Substances Act 1993|public|12|27-05-1993|maintained=y|An Act to consolidate certain enactments relating to radioactive substances with corrections and minor improvements made under the Consolidation of Enactments (Procedure) Act 1949.}} |- | {{|Carrying of Knives etc. (Scotland) Act 1993|public|13|27-05-1993|maintained=y|An Act to provide, as respects Scotland, for it to be an offence to have in a public place an article with a blade or point; and for connected purposes.}} |- | {{|Disability (Grants) Act 1993|public|14|27-05-1993|maintained=y|An Act to provide for the making of grants by the Secretary of State and the Department of Health and Social Services for Northern Ireland to the Independent Living (Extension) Fund, the Independent Living (1993) Fund and Motability.}} |- | {{|Protection of Animals (Scotland) Act 1993|public|15|27-05-1993|maintained=y|An Act to increase the penalties for certain offences under the Protection of Animals (Scotland) Act 1912.}} |- | {{|Foreign Compensation (Amendment) Act 1993|public|16|27-05-1993|maintained=y|An Act to amend the Foreign Compensation Act 1950 so as to extend the powers to make Orders in Council under section 3 of that Act; and for connected purposes.}} |- | {{|Non-Domestic Rating Act 1993|public|17|27-05-1993|maintained=y|An Act to make further provision with respect to non-domestic rating for the period beginning with 1st April 1993 and ending with 31st March 1995; and for connected purposes.}} |- | {{|Reinsurance (Acts of Terrorism) Act 1993|public|18|27-05-1993|maintained=y|An Act to provide for the payment out of money provided by Parliament or into the Consolidated Fund of sums referable to reinsurance liabilities entered into by the Secretary of State in respect of loss or damage to property resulting from or consequential upon acts of terrorism and losses consequential on such loss or damage.}} |- | {{|Trade Union Reform and Employment Rights Act 1993|public|19|01-07-1993|maintained=y|An Act to make further reforms of the law relating to trade unions and industrial relations; to make amendments of the law relating to employment rights and to abolish the right to statutory minimum remuneration; to amend the law relating to the constitution and jurisdiction of industrial tribunals and the Employment Appeal Tribunal; to amend section 56A of the Sex Discrimination Act 1975; to provide for the Secretary of State to have functions of securing the provision of careers services; to make further provision about employment and training functions of Scottish Enterprise and of Highlands and Islands Enterprise; and for connected purposes.}} |- | {{|Licensing (Amendment) (Scotland) Act 1993|public|20|01-07-1993|maintained=y|An Act to amend section 23(2) of the Licensing (Scotland) Act 1976 in relation to certain planning certificates.}} |- | {{|Osteopaths Act 1993|public|21|01-07-1993|maintained=y|An Act to establish a body to be known as the General Osteopathic Council; to provide for the regulation of the profession of osteopathy, including making provision as to the registration of osteopaths and as to their professional education and conduct; to make provision in connection with the development and promotion of the profession; and for connected purposes.}} |- | {{|Merchant Shipping (Registration, etc.) Act 1993|public|22|01-07-1993|maintained=y|An Act to amend and restate the law relating to the registration of ships and related matters, to make provision in relation to ships on bareboat charter and to make amendments designed to facilitate, or otherwise desirable in connection with, the consolidation of the enactments relating to shipping and seamen.}} |- | {{|Asylum and Immigration Appeals Act 1993|public|23|01-07-1993|maintained=y|An Act to make provision about persons who claim asylum in the United Kingdom and their dependants; to amend the law with respect to certain rights of appeal under the Immigration Act 1971; and to extend the provisions of the Immigration (Carriers' Liability) Act 1987 to transit passengers.}} |- | {{|Video Recordings Act 1993|public|24|20-07-1993|maintained=y|An Act to amend the Video Recordings Act 1984 and, so far as it relates to evidence by certificate in respect of offences under the 1984 Act, the Criminal Justice (Scotland) Act 1980.}} |- | {{|Local Government (Overseas Assistance) Act 1993|public|25|20-07-1993|maintained=y|An Act to enable local authorities in Great Britain to provide advice and assistance as respects matters in which they have skill and experience to bodies engaged outside the United Kingdom in the carrying on of any of the activities of local government.}} |- | {{|Bail (Amendment) Act 1993|public|26|20-07-1993|maintained=y|An Act to confer upon the prosecution a right of appeal against decisions to grant bail.}} |- | {{|Local Government (Amendment) Act 1993|public|27|20-07-1993|maintained=y|An Act to amend section 11 of the Local Government Act 1966 to permit grants to be made to local authorities making special provisions in exercising their functions, in consequence of the presence within their areas of persons belonging to ethnic minorities; and for connected purposes.}} |- | {{|Leasehold Reform, Housing and Urban Development Act 1993|public|28|20-07-1993|maintained=y|An Act to confer rights to collective enfranchisement and lease renewal on tenants of flats; to make further provision with respect to enfranchisement by tenants of houses; to make provision for auditing the management, by landlords or other persons, of residential property and for the approval of codes of practice relating thereto; to amend Parts III and IV of the Landlord and Tenant Act 1987; to confer jurisdiction on leasehold valuation tribunals as respects Crown land; to make provision for rendering void agreements preventing the occupation of leasehold property by persons with mental disorders; to amend Parts II, IV and V of the Housing Act 1985, Schedule 2 to the Housing Associations Act 1985, Parts I and III and sections 248 and 299 of the Housing (Scotland) Act 1987, Part III of the Housing Act 1988, and Part VI of the Local Government and Housing Act 1989; to make provision with respect to certain disposals requiring consent under Part II of the Housing Act 1985, including provision for the payment of a levy; to alter the basis of certain contributions by the Secretary of State under section 569 of that Act; to establish and confer functions on a body to replace the English Industrial Estates Corporation and to be known as the Urban Regeneration Agency; to provide for the designation of certain urban and other areas and to make provision as to the effect of such designation; to amend section 23 of the Land Compensation Act 1961, section 98 of the Local Government, Planning and Land Act 1980 and section 27 of the Housing and Planning Act 1986; to make further provision with respect to urban development corporations and urban development areas; and for connected purposes.}} |- | {{|Representation of the People Act 1993|public|29|20-07-1993|maintained=y|An Act to secure that members of the regular army who, except for the purposes of training, are required to serve only in Northern Ireland are not regarded as members of the forces for the purposes of the Representation of the People Act 1983.}} |- | {{|Sexual Offences Act 1993|public|30|20-07-1993|maintained=y|An Act to abolish the presumption of criminal law that a boy under the age of fourteen is incapable of sexual intercourse.}} |- | {{|Road Traffic (Driving Instruction by Disabled Persons) Act 1993|public|31|20-07-1993|maintained=y|An Act to make provision for enabling persons with certain physical disabilities to be authorised, in certain circumstances, to give paid instruction in the driving of motor cars; and for purposes connected therewith.}} |- | {{|European Communities (Amendment) Act 1993|public|32|20-07-1993|maintained=y|An Act to make provision consequential on the Treaty on European Union signed at Maastricht on 7th February 1992.}} |- | {{|Appropriation Act 1993|public|33|27-07-1993|maintained=y|An Act to apply a sum out of the Consolidated Fund to the service of the year ending on 31st March 1994, to appropriate the supplies granted in this Session of Parliament, and to repeal certain Consolidated Fund and Appropriation Acts.}} |- | {{|Finance Act 1993|public|34|27-07-1993|maintained=y|An Act to grant certain duties, to alter other duties, and to amend the law relating to the National Debt and the Public Revenue, and to make further provision in connection with Finance.}} |- | {{|Education Act 1993|public|35|27-07-1993|maintained=y|An Act to amend the law about education.}} |- | {{|Criminal Justice Act 1993|public|36|27-07-1993|maintained=y|An Act to make provision about the jurisdiction of courts in England and Wales in relation to certain offences of dishonesty and blackmail; to amend the law about drug trafficking offences and to implement provisions of the Community Council Directive No. 91/308/EEC; to amend Part VI of the Criminal Justice Act 1988; to make provision with respect to the financing of terrorism, the proceeds of terrorist-related activities and the investigation of terrorist activities; to amend Part I of the Criminal Justice Act 1991; to implement provisions of the Community Council Directive No. 89/592/EEC and to amend and restate the law about insider dealing in securities; to provide for certain offences created by the Banking Coordination (Second Council Directive) Regulations 1992 to be punishable in the same way as offences under sections 39, 40 and 41 of the Banking Act 1987 and to enable regulations implementing Article 15 of the Community Council Directive No. 89/646/EEC and Articles 3, 6 and 7 of the Community Council Directive No. 92/30/EEC to create offences punishable in that way; to make provision with respect to the penalty for causing death by dangerous driving or causing death by careless driving while under the influence of drink or drugs; to make it an offence to assist in or induce certain conduct which for the purposes of, or in connection with, the provisions of Community law is unlawful in another member State; to provide for the introduction of safeguards in connection with the return of persons under backing of warrants arrangements; to amend the Criminal Procedure (Scotland) Act 1975 and Part I of the Prisoners and Criminal Proceedings (Scotland) Act 1993; and for connected purposes.}} |- | {{|Agriculture Act 1993|public|37|27-07-1993|maintained=y|An Act to make provision about milk marketing; to make provision about potato marketing; to provide for the payment of grants in connection with the marketing of certain commodities; to terminate national price support arrangements for wool and potatoes; to provide for the publication of an annual report on matters relevant to price support; to amend the Industrial Organisation and Development Act 1947 in relation to agriculture; and for connected purposes.}} |- | {{|Welsh Language Act 1993|public|38|21-10-1993|maintained=y|An Act to establish a Board having the function of promoting and facilitating the use of the Welsh language, to provide for the preparation by public bodies of schemes giving effect to the principle that in the conduct of public business and the administration of justice in Wales the English and Welsh languages should be treated on a basis of equality, to make further provision relating to the Welsh language, to repeal certain spent enactments relating to Wales, and for connected purposes.}} |- | {{|National Lottery etc. Act 1993|public|39|21-10-1993|maintained=y|An Act to authorise lotteries to be promoted as part of a National Lottery; to make provision with respect to the running and regulation of that National Lottery and with respect to the distribution of its net proceeds; to increase the membership and extend the powers of the Trustees of the National Heritage Memorial Fund; to amend section 1 of the Revenue Act 1898 and the Lotteries and Amusements Act 1976; to amend the law relating to pool betting; and for connected purposes.}} |- | {{|Noise and Statutory Nuisance Act 1993|public|40|05-11-1993|maintained=y|An Act to make provision for noise in a street to be a statutory nuisance; to make provision with respect to the operation of loudspeakers in a street; to make provision with respect to audible intruder alarms; to make provision for expenses incurred by local authorities in abating, or preventing the recurrence of, a statutory nuisance to be a charge on the premises to which they relate; and for connected purposes.}} |- | {{|European Parliamentary Elections Act 1993|public|41|05-11-1993|maintained=y|An Act to give effect to a Decision of the Council of the European Communities, 93/81/Euratom, ECSC, EEC, of 1st February 1993 having the effect of increasing the number of United Kingdom representatives to be elected to the European Parliament; and for connected purposes.}} |- | {{|Cardiff Bay Barrage Act 1993|public|42|05-11-1993|maintained=y|An Act to provide for the construction by the Cardiff Bay Development Corporation of a barrage across the mouth of Cardiff Bay with an outer harbour and for related works; to make provision for the acquisition and use of land for the works; to make provision about the operation and management of the barrage, the outer harbour and the water impounded by the barrage; to make provision for dealing with property damage resulting from any alteration of groundwater levels which may occur in consequence of the construction of the barrage; to enable other protective provisions to be made; and for connected purposes.}} |- | {{|Railways Act 1993|public|43|05-11-1993|maintained=y|An Act to provide for the appointment and functions of a Rail Regulator and a Director of Passenger Rail Franchising and of users' consultative committees for the railway industry and for certain ferry services; to make new provision with respect to the provision of railway services and the persons by whom they are to be provided or who are to secure their provision; to make provision for and in connection with the grant and acquisition of rights over, and the disposal or other transfer and vesting of, any property, rights or liabilities by means of which railway services are, or are to be, provided; to amend the functions of the British Railways Board; to make provision with respect to the safety of railways and the protection of railway employees and members of the public from personal injury and other risks arising from the construction or operation of railways; to make further provision with respect to transport police; to make provision with respect to certain railway pension schemes; to make provision for and in connection with the payment of grants and subsidies in connection with railways and in connection with the provision of facilities for freight haulage by inland waterway; to make provision in relation to tramways and other guided transport systems; and for connected purposes.}} |- | {{|Crofters (Scotland) Act 1993|public|44|05-11-1993|maintained=y|An Act to consolidate certain enactments relating to crofting, with amendments to give effect to recommendations of the Scottish Law Commission.}} |- | {{|Scottish Land Court Act 1993|public|45|05-11-1993|maintained=y|An Act to consolidate certain enactments relating to the constitution and proceedings of the Scottish Land Court; and to repeal provisions of the Crofters Holdings (Scotland) Act 1886 relating to the Scottish Land Court which are no longer of practical utility.}} |- | {{|Health Service Commissioners Act 1993|public|46|05-11-1993|maintained=y|An Act to consolidate the enactments relating to the Health Service Commissioners for England, for Wales and for Scotland with amendments to give effect to recommendations of the Law Commission and the Scottish Law Commission.}} |- | {{|Probation Service Act 1993|public|47|05-11-1993|maintained=y|An Act to consolidate certain enactments relating to the probation service and its functions and to arrangements for persons on bail and the rehabilitation of offenders, with amendments to give effect to recommendations of the Law Commission.}} |- | {{|Pension Schemes Act 1993|public|48|05-11-1993|maintained=y|An Act to consolidate certain enactments relating to pension schemes with amendments to give effect to recommendations of the Law Commission and the Scottish Law Commission.}} |- | {{|Pension Schemes (Northern Ireland) Act 1993|public|49|05-11-1993|maintained=y|An Act to consolidate for Northern Ireland certain enactments relating to pension schemes, with corrections and minor improvements under the Consolidation of Enactments (Procedure) Act 1949.}} |- | {{|Statute Law (Repeals) Act 1993|public|50|05-11-1993|maintained=y|An Act to promote the reform of the statute law by the repeal, in accordance with recommendations of the Law Commission and the Scottish Law Commission, of certain enactments which (except in so far as their effect is preserved) are no longer of practical utility, and to make other provision in connection with the repeal of those enactments; and to correct a mistake in the Statute Law (Repeals) Act 1978.}} |- | {{|European Economic Area Act 1993|public|51|05-11-1993|maintained=y|An Act to make provision in relation to the European Economic Area established under the Agreement signed at Oporto on 2nd May 1992 as adjusted by the Protocol signed at Brussels on 17th March 1993.}} }}

== Local acts ==
{{legislationuk|act |- | {{|Pittenweem Harbour Order Confirmation Act 1992|local|9|18-06-1992|maintained=y|An Act to confirm a Provisional Order under the Private Legislation Procedure (Scotland) Act 1936, relating to Pittenweem Harbour.|po1=Pittenweem Harbour Order 1992|Provisional Order to make provision for the improvement of Pittenweem Harbour by the Fife Regional Council; and for connected purposes.}} |- | {{|Mersey Docks and Harbour Act 1992|local|10|18-06-1992|maintained=y|An Act to confer additional powers upon The Mersey Docks and Harbour Company; to amend the Mersey Docks and Harbour Act 1971 and the Mersey Docks and Harbour Act 1986; and for connected or other purposes.}} |- | {{|British Railways (No. 2) Act 1992|local|11|18-06-1992|maintained=y|An Act to empower the British Railways Board to construct works and to acquire land; to confer further powers on the Board; and for other purposes.}} |- | {{|Peterhead Harbours Order Confirmation Act 1992|local|12|16-07-1992|maintained=y|An Act to confirm a Provisional Order under the Private Legislation Procedure (Scotland) Act 1936, relating to Peterhead Harbours.|po1=Peterhead Harbours Order 1992|Provisional Order to consolidate with additions and amendments the Acts and Orders relating to the harbours of Peterhead; to make new provision with respect to the constitution, qualification, election and appointment of the trustees of the said harbours; to redefine the limits of the harbours; to make further and better provision for the maintenance and administration of the harbours; and for connected purposes.}} |- | {{|Ulster Bank Act 1992|local|13|16-07-1992|maintained=y|An Act to provide for the transfer to and vesting in Ulster Bank Limited of the undertaking of Ulster Bank Executor and Trustee Services Company; and for other purposes.}} |- | {{|Cattewater Reclamation Act 1992|local|14|16-07-1992|maintained=y|An Act to empower New Cattedown Limited to construct works in the Cattewater in the city of Plymouth; to authorise the Company to acquire lands; and for other purposes.}} |- | {{|River Humber (Upper Pyewipe Outfall) Act 1992|local|15|16-07-1992|maintained=y|An Act to authorise CIBA-GEIGY Chemicals Limited to construct works and to purchase or use land at Pyewipe, Grimsby, in the county of Humberside; to confer further powers on the Company; and for connected purposes.}} |- | {{|London Regional Transport (Penalty Fares) Act 1992|local|16|12-11-1992|maintained=y|An Act to empower the charging of a penalty fare in substitution for the proper fare for persons using transport services under the control of London Regional Transport without a valid ticket for such use; and for related purposes.}} |- | {{|Price's Patent Candle Company Limited Act 1992|local|17|12-11-1992|maintained=y|An Act to confer further powers on Price's Patent Candle Company Limited; and for other purposes.}} |- | {{|Greater Manchester (Light Rapid Transit System) Act 1992|local|18|12-11-1992|maintained=y|An Act to empower the Greater Manchester Passenger Transport Executive to construct further works and to acquire additional lands; to confer further powers on the Executive; and for other purposes.}} |- | {{|Llanelli Borough Council (River Lliedi) Act 1992|local|19|03-12-1992|maintained=y|An Act to extinguish all rights of navigation over part of the river Lliedi in Llanelli; and for connected or other purposes.}} |- | {{|Durham Markets Company Act 1992|local|20|03-12-1992|maintained=y|An Act to confer further powers on the Durham Markets Company Limited; and for other purposes.}} |- | {{|City of Bristol (Portishead Docks) Act 1992|local|21|03-12-1992|maintained=y|An Act to empower the City Council of Bristol to close the Portishead Docks and to dispose of the Portishead Docks undertaking; to provide for the repeal of certain enactments relating to the Portishead Docks; and for connected or other purposes.}} |- | {{|London Underground (King's Cross) Act 1993|local|1|29-01-1993|maintained=y|An Act to empower London Underground Limited, for safety purposes and the relief of passenger congestion, to construct works and to acquire or use lands; to confer further powers on the Company; and for connected purposes.}} |- | {{|South Yorkshire Light Rail Transit Act 1993|local|2|18-02-1993|maintained=y|An Act to make further provision with respect to the light rail transit system authorised by the South Yorkshire Light Rail Transit Acts 1988 to 1990; to authorise the construction of works and for other purposes.}} |- | {{|Alliance & Leicester (Girobank) Act 1993|local|3|29-03-1993|maintained=y|An Act to provide for the vesting in Alliance & Leicester Building Society of part of the undertaking of Girobank plc; and for other purposes.}} |- | {{|British Railways Act 1993|local|4|29-03-1993|maintained=y|An Act to empower the British Railways Board to construct works and to acquire land; to confer further powers on the Board; and for other purposes.}} |- | {{|Midland Metro Act 1993|local|5|27-05-1993|maintained=y|An Act to empower the West Midlands Passenger Transport Executive to construct works at Chelmsley Wood in the Metropolitan Borough of Solihull for their light rail rapid passenger transport system; to authorise the acquisition of lands for that purpose; to confer further powers upon the Executive; and for related purposes.}} |- | {{|Midland Metro (No. 2) Act 1993|local|6|27-05-1993|maintained=y|An Act to empower the West Midlands Passenger Transport Executive to construct additional works for extension of their light rail rapid passenger transport system and substituted works for parts of that system; to authorise the acquisition of lands for that purpose; to confer further powers upon the Executive; and for related purposes.}} |- | {{|London Docklands Railway (Lewisham) Act 1993|local|7|27-05-1993|maintained=y|An Act to empower Docklands Light Railway Limited to construct works and to acquire lands; to confer further powers on Docklands Light Railway Limited; and for related purposes.}} |- | {{|London Docklands Railway (Lewisham) (No. 2) 1993|local|8|27-05-1993|maintained=y|An Act to authorise the transfer of the functions of Docklands Light Railway Limited in respect of the extension of the Docklands Railway to Lewisham; and for related purposes.}} |- | {{|London Underground (Jubilee) Act 1993|local|9|01-07-1993|maintained=y|An Act to empower London Underground Limited to construct works and to acquire lands; to confer further powers on London Underground Limited; and for related purposes.}} |- | {{|Dawat-e-Hadiyah Act 1993|local|10|01-07-1993|maintained=y|An Act to incorporate the Dai al-Mutlaq as a corporation sole; and for related purposes.}} |- | {{|Harris Tweed Act 1993|local|11|20-07-1993|maintained=y|An Act to make provision for the establishment of a Harris Tweed Authority to promote and maintain the authenticity, standard and reputation of Harris Tweed; for the definition of Harris Tweed; for preventing the sale as Harris Tweed of material which does not fall within the definition; for the Authority to become the successor to The Harris Tweed Association Limited; and for other purposes incidental thereto.}} |- | {{|Highland Regional Council (Wester Bridge) Order Confirmation Act 1993|local|12|27-07-1993|maintained=y|An Act to confirm a Provisional Order under the Private Legislation Procedure (Scotland) Act 1936, relating to Highland Regional Council (Wester Bridge).|po1=Highland Regional Council (Wester Bridge) Order 1993|Provisional Order to authorise The Highland Regional Council to acquire lands; to construct and maintain a new bridge at Wester in Caithness being part of the A9 Wick to John O'Groats road and to construct other related works; to confer power to close the bridge to traffic; and for other purposes.}} |- | {{|Pwllheli Harbour (Amendment) Act 1993|local|13|27-07-1993|maintained=y|An Act to make further provision with respect to the use of land in or around Pwllheli Harbour and with respect to the disposal of certain land within that harbour.}} |- | {{|Allied Irish Banks Act 1993|local|14|27-07-1993|maintained=y|An Act to provide for the transfer to AIB Group Northern Ireland plc of part of the undertaking of Allied Irish Banks, p.l.c.; and for related purposes.}} |- | {{|Leeds Supertram Act 1993|local|15|27-07-1993|maintained=y|An Act to empower the West Yorkshire Passenger Transport Executive in conjunction with the Leeds City Council to develop and operate a light rail or supertram system of passenger transport in the City of Leeds; to authorise the construction of works; to confer powers upon the Executive and the City Council for the acquisition of lands for that purpose; and for other purposes.}} |- | {{|Woodgrange Park Cemetery Act 1993|local|16|05-11-1993|maintained=y|An Act to remove, as respects part of the land comprised in Woodgrange Park Cemetery, all trusts, obligations, disabilities and restrictions that are attached to that land by reason of its being used or set apart for the interment of human remains or by reason of its being a cemetery or disused burial ground; and for related purposes.}} |- | {{|Citibank International Act 1993|local|17|05-11-1993|maintained=y|An Act to provide for the transfer to and vesting in Citibank International plc of the undertakings of Citicorp Finance PLC, Citibank Trust Limited, The Diners Club Limited, Citibank Leasing Limited, Cardholder Services Limited, Citicorp Scrimgeour Vickers Securities Limited and Citibank Financial Trust Limited; and for connected purposes.}} |- | {{|Unibank Act 1993|local|18|05-11-1993|maintained=y|An Act to provide for the transfer to and vesting in Unibank A/S of the undertaking of Unibank plc; and for other purposes.}} }}
