= List of acts of the 1st session of the 55th Parliament of the United Kingdom =

This is a list of acts of the 1st session of the 55th Parliament of the United Kingdom, which ran from 18 May 2010 until 1 May 2012.

Acts passed since 1963 are cited by calendar year, as opposed to the convention used for earlier acts of citing the regnal year(s) in which the relevant parliamentary session was held. Each act passed in a respective year is given a chapter number (abbreviated "c."), denoted by Arabic numerals in the case of public general acts, lowercase Roman numerals in the case of local acts, or italicised Arabic numerals in the case of personal acts. These run as separate series.

53 acts of Parliament were passed by the 55th Parliament in its 1st session: 49 public general acts and 4 local acts.

indicates that an act is available to view at legislation.gov.uk, and indicates the location of the original act in the Parliamentary Archives.

== Public general acts ==
{{legislationuk|act |- | {{|Appropriation (No. 3) Act 2010|public|30|27-07-2010|maintained=y|An Act to authorise the use of resources for the service of the year ending with 31 March 2011 and to apply certain sums out of the Consolidated Fund to the service of the year ending with 31 March 2011; to appropriate the supply authorised in this Session of Parliament for the service of the year ending with 31 March 2011; and to repeal certain Consolidated Fund and Appropriation Acts.}} |- | {{|Finance (No. 2) Act 2010|public|31|27-07-2010|maintained=y|An Act to grant certain duties, to alter other duties, and to amend the law relating to the National Debt and the Public Revenue, and to make further provision in connection with finance.}} |- | {{|Academies Act 2010|public|32|27-07-2010|maintained=y|An Act to make provision about Academies.}} |- | {{|Finance (No. 3) Act 2010|public|33|16-12-2010|maintained=y|An Act to grant certain duties, to alter other duties, and to amend the law relating to the National Debt and the Public Revenue, and to make further provision in connection with finance.}} |- | {{|Equitable Life (Payments) Act 2010|public|34|16-12-2010|maintained=y|An Act to provide finance for payments in cases where persons have been adversely affected by maladministration in the regulation before December 2001 of the Equitable Life Assurance Society; and for connected purposes.}} |- | {{|Local Government Act 2010|public|35|16-12-2010|maintained=y|An Act to prevent the implementation of existing proposals made for the purposes of Part 1 of the Local Government and Public Involvement in Health Act 2007.}} |- | {{|Savings Accounts and Health in Pregnancy Grant Act 2010|public|36|16-12-2010|maintained=y|An Act to make provision about eligibility for a child trust fund; to repeal the Saving Gateway Accounts Act 2009; to make provision about entitlement to health in pregnancy grant; and for connected purposes.}} |- | {{|Superannuation Act 2010|public|37|16-12-2010|maintained=y|An Act to make provision for and in connection with limiting the value of the benefits which may be provided under so much of any scheme under section 1 of the Superannuation Act 1972 as provides by virtue of section 2(2) of that Act for benefits to be provided by way of compensation to or in respect of persons who suffer loss of office or employment; and to make provision about the procedure for modifying such a scheme.}} |- | {{|Terrorist Asset-Freezing etc. Act 2010|public|38|16-12-2010|maintained=y|An Act to make provision for imposing financial restrictions on, and in relation to, certain persons believed or suspected to be, or to have been, involved in terrorist activities; to amend Schedule 7 to the Counter-Terrorism Act 2008; and for connected purposes.}} |- | {{|Consolidated Fund Act 2010|public|39|21-12-2010|maintained=y|An Act to authorise the use of resources for the service of the year ending with 31 March 2011 and to apply certain sums out of the Consolidated Fund to the service of the year ending with 31 March 2011; and to authorise the use of resources for the year ending with 31 March 2012 and the issue of sums out of the Consolidated Fund for the year ending with 31 March 2012.}} |- | {{|Identity Documents Act 2010|public|40|21-12-2010|maintained=y|An Act to make provision for and in connection with the repeal of the Identity Cards Act 2006.}} |- | {{|Loans to Ireland Act 2010|public|41|21-12-2010|maintained=y|An Act to make provision in connection with the making of loans to Ireland by the United Kingdom.}} |- | {{|Parliamentary Voting System and Constituencies Act 2011|public|1|16-02-2011|maintained=y|An Act to make provision for a referendum on the voting system for parliamentary elections and to provide for parliamentary elections to be held under the alternative vote system if a majority of those voting in the referendum are in favour of that; to make provision about the number and size of parliamentary constituencies; and for connected purposes.}} |- | {{|Appropriation Act 2011|public|2|16-03-2011|maintained=y|An Act to authorise the use of resources for the service of the years ending with 31 March 2010 and 31 March 2011 and to apply certain sums out of the Consolidated Fund to the service of the years ending with 31 March 2010 and 31 March 2011; and to appropriate the supply authorised in this Session of Parliament for the service of the years ending with 31 March 2010 and 31 March 2011.}} |- | {{|National Insurance Contributions Act 2011|public|3|22-03-2011|maintained=y|An Act to make provision for and in connection with increasing rates of national insurance contributions and a regional secondary Class 1 contributions holiday for new businesses.}} |- | {{|Budget Responsibility and National Audit Act 2011|public|4|22-03-2011|maintained=y|An Act to make provision for a Charter for Budget Responsibility and for the publication of Financial Statements and Budget Reports; to establish the Office for Budget Responsibility; to make provision about the Comptroller and Auditor General and to establish a body corporate called the National Audit Office; to amend Schedules 5 and 7 to the Government of Wales Act 2006 in relation to the Auditor General for Wales; and for connected purposes.}} |- | {{|Postal Services Act 2011|public|5|13-06-2011|maintained=y|An Act to make provision for the restructuring of the Royal Mail group and about the Royal Mail Pension Plan; to make new provision about the regulation of postal services, including provision for a special administration regime; and for connected purposes.}} |- | {{|Sports Grounds Safety Authority Act 2011|public|6|12-07-2011|maintained=y|An Act to confer further powers on the Football Licensing Authority and to amend its name; and for connected purposes.}} |- | {{|Estates of Deceased Persons (Forfeiture Rule and Law of Succession) Act 2011|public|7|12-07-2011|maintained=y|An Act to amend the law relating to the distribution of the estates of deceased persons; and for connected purposes.}} |- | {{|Wreck Removal Convention Act 2011|public|8|12-07-2011|maintained=y|An Act to implement the Nairobi International Convention on the Removal of Wrecks 2007.}} |- | {{|Police (Detention and Bail) Act 2011|public|9|12-07-2011|maintained=y|An Act to make provision about the calculation of certain periods of time for the purposes of Part 4 of the Police and Criminal Evidence Act 1984.}} |- | {{|Supply and Appropriation (Main Estimates) Act 2011|public|10|19-07-2011|maintained=y|An Act to authorise the use of resources for the year ending with 31 March 2012; to authorise both the issue of sums out of the Consolidated Fund and the application of income for that year; and to appropriate the supply authorised for that year by this Act and by the Consolidated Fund Act 2010.}} |- | {{|Finance Act 2011|public|11|19-07-2011|maintained=y|An Act to grant certain duties, to alter other duties, and to amend the law relating to the National Debt and the Public Revenue, and to make further provision in connection with finance.}} |- | {{|European Union Act 2011|public|12|19-07-2011|maintained=y|An Act to make provision about treaties relating to the European Union and decisions made under them, including provision implementing the Protocol signed at Brussels on 23 June 2010 amending the Protocol (No. 36) on transitional provisions annexed to the Treaty on European Union, to the Treaty on the Functioning of the European Union and to the Treaty establishing the European Atomic Energy Community; and to make provision about the means by which directly applicable or directly effective European Union law has effect in the United Kingdom.}} |- | {{|Police Reform and Social Responsibility Act 2011|public|13|15-09-2011|maintained=y|An Act to make provision about the administration and governance of police forces; about the licensing of, and for the imposition of a late night levy in relation to, the sale and supply of alcohol, and for the repeal of provisions about alcohol disorder zones; for the repeal of sections 132 to 138 of the Serious Organised Crime and Police Act 2005 and for the prohibition of certain activities in Parliament Square; to enable provision in local authority byelaws to include powers of seizure and forfeiture; about the control of dangerous or otherwise harmful drugs; to restrict the issue of arrest warrants for certain extra-territorial offences; and for connected purposes.}} |- | {{|Fixed-term Parliaments Act 2011|public|14|15-09-2011|maintained=y|An Act to make provision about the dissolution of Parliament and the determination of polling days for parliamentary general elections; and for connected purposes.}} |- | {{|Sovereign Grant Act 2011|public|15|18-10-2011|maintained=y|An Act to make provision for the honour and dignity of the Crown and the Royal Family; make provision about allowances and pensions under the Civil List Acts of 1837 and 1952; and for connected purposes.}} |- | {{|Energy Act 2011|public|16|18-10-2011|maintained=y|An Act to make provision for the arrangement and financing of energy efficiency improvements to be made to properties by owners and occupiers; about the energy efficiency of properties in the private rented sector; about the promotion by energy companies of reductions in carbon emissions and home-heating costs; about information relating to energy consumption, efficiency and tariffs; for increasing the security of energy supplies; about access to upstream petroleum infrastructure and downstream gas processing facilities; about a special administration regime for energy supply companies; about designations under the Continental Shelf Act 1964; about licence modifications relating to offshore transmission and distribution of electricity; about the security of nuclear construction sites; about the decommissioning of nuclear sites and offshore infrastructure; for the use of pipelines for carbon capture and storage; for an annual report on contribution to carbon emissions reduction targets; for action relating to the energy efficiency of residential accommodation in England; for the generation of electricity from renewable sources; about renewable heat incentives in Northern Ireland; about the powers of the Coal Authority; for an amendment of section 137 of the Energy Act 2004; for the amendment and repeal of measures relating to home energy efficiency; and for connected purposes.}} |- | {{|Coinage (Measurement) Act 2011|public|17|03-11-2011|maintained=y|An Act to make provision about the arrangements for measuring the standard weight of coins.}} |- | {{|Armed Forces Act 2011|public|18|03-11-2011|maintained=y|An Act to continue the Armed Forces Act 2006; to amend that Act and other enactments relating to the armed forces and the Ministry of Defence Police; to amend the Visiting Forces Act 1952; to enable judge advocates to sit in civilian courts; to repeal the Naval Medical Compassionate Fund Act 1915; to make provision about the call out of reserve forces; and for connected purposes.}} |- | {{|Pensions Act 2011|public|19|03-11-2011|maintained=y|An Act to make provision relating to pensions; and for connected purposes.}} |- | {{|Localism Act 2011|public|20|15-11-2011|maintained=y|An Act to make provision about the functions and procedures of local and certain other authorities; to make provision about the functions of the Commission for Local Administration in England; to enable the recovery of financial sanctions imposed by the Court of Justice of the European Union on the United Kingdom from local and public authorities; to make provision about local government finance; to make provision about town and country planning, the Community Infrastructure Levy and the authorisation of nationally significant infrastructure projects; to make provision about social and other housing; to make provision about regeneration in London; and for connected purposes.}} |- | {{|Education Act 2011|public|21|15-11-2011|maintained=y|An Act to make provision about education, childcare, apprenticeships and training; to make provision about schools and the school workforce, institutions within the further education sector and Academies; to abolish the General Teaching Council for England, the Training and Development Agency for Schools, the School Support Staff Negotiating Body, the Qualifications and Curriculum Development Agency and the Young People's Learning Agency for England; to make provision about the Office of Qualifications and Examinations Regulation and the Chief Executive of Skills Funding; to make provision about student loans and fees; and for connected purposes.}} |- | {{|London Olympic Games and Paralympic Games (Amendment) Act 2011|public|22|14-12-2011|maintained=y|An Act to amend the London Olympic Games and Paralympic Games Act 2006.}} |- | {{|Terrorism Prevention and Investigation Measures Act 2011|public|23|14-12-2011|maintained=y|An Act to abolish control orders and make provision for the imposition of terrorism prevention and investigation measures.}} |- | {{|Public Bodies Act 2011|public|24|14-12-2011|maintained=y|An Act to confer powers on Ministers of the Crown in relation to certain public bodies and offices; to confer powers on Welsh Ministers in relation to environmental and other public bodies; to make provision about delegation and shared services in relation to persons exercising environmental functions; to abolish regional development agencies; to make provision about the funding of Sianel Pedwar Cymru; to make provision about the powers of bodies established under the National Heritage Act 1983 to form companies; to repeal provisions of the Coroners and Justice Act 2009 relating to appeals to the Chief Coroner; to make provision about amendment of Schedule 1 to the Superannuation Act 1972; and for connected purposes.}} |- | {{|Charities Act 2011|public|25|14-12-2011|maintained=y|An Act to consolidate the Charities Act 1993 and other enactments which relate to charities.}} |- | {{|Supply and Appropriation (Anticipation and Adjustments) Act 2012|public|1|08-03-2012|maintained=y|An Act to authorise the use of resources for the years ending with 31 March 2012 and 31 March 2013; to authorise the issue of sums out of the Consolidated Fund for those years and for the year ending with 31 March 2011; and to appropriate the supply authorised by this Act for the years ending with 31 March 2011 and 31 March 2012.}} |- | {{|Live Music Act 2012|public|2|08-03-2012|maintained=y|An Act to amend the Licensing Act 2003 with respect to the performance of live music entertainment; and for connected purposes.}} |- | {{|Public Services (Social Value) Act 2012|public|3|08-03-2012|maintained=y|An Act to require public authorities to have regard to economic, social and environmental well-being in connection with public services contracts; and for connected purposes.}} |- | {{|Domestic Violence, Crime and Victims (Amendment) Act 2012|public|4|08-03-2012|maintained=y|An Act to amend section 5 of the Domestic Violence, Crime and Victims Act 2004 to include serious harm to a child or vulnerable adult; to make consequential amendments to the Act; and for connected purposes.}} |- | {{|Welfare Reform Act 2012|public|5|08-03-2012|maintained=y|An Act to make provision for universal credit and personal independence payment; to make other provision about social security and tax credits; to make provision about the functions of the registration service, child support maintenance and the use of jobcentres; to establish the Social Mobility and Child Poverty Commission and otherwise amend the Child Poverty Act 2010; and for connected purposes.}} |- | {{|Consumer Insurance (Disclosure and Representations) Act 2012|public|6|08-03-2012|maintained=y|An Act to make provision about disclosure and representations in connection with consumer insurance contracts.}} |- | {{|Health and Social Care Act 2012|public|7|27-03-2012|maintained=y|An Act to establish and make provision about a National Health Service Commissioning Board and clinical commissioning groups and to make other provision about the National Health Service in England; to make provision about public health in the United Kingdom; to make provision about regulating health and adult social care services; to make provision about public involvement in health and social care matters, scrutiny of health matters by local authorities and co-operation between local authorities and commissioners of health care services; to make provision about regulating health and social care workers; to establish and make provision about a National Institute for Health and Care Excellence; to establish and make provision about a Health and Social Care Information Centre and to make other provision about information relating to health or social care matters; to abolish certain public bodies involved in health or social care; to make other provision about health care; and for connected purposes.}} |- | {{|Water Industry (Financial Assistance) Act 2012|public|8|01-05-2012|maintained=y|An Act to make provision for the giving of financial assistance for the purpose of securing the reduction of charges for the supply of water and the provision of sewerage services and in connection with the construction of, and the carrying out of works in respect of, water and sewerage infrastructure.}} |- | {{|Protection of Freedoms Act 2012|public|9|01-05-2012|maintained=y|An Act to provide for the destruction, retention, use and other regulation of certain evidential material; to impose consent and other requirements in relation to certain processing of biometric information relating to children; to provide for a code of practice about surveillance camera systems and for the appointment and role of the Surveillance Camera Commissioner; to provide for judicial approval in relation to certain authorisations and notices under the Regulation of Investigatory Powers Act 2000; to provide for the repeal or rewriting of powers of entry and associated powers and for codes of practice and other safeguards in relation to such powers; to make provision about vehicles left on land; to amend the maximum detention period for terrorist suspects; to replace certain stop and search powers and to provide for a related code of practice; to make provision about the safeguarding of vulnerable groups and about criminal records including provision for the establishment of the Disclosure and Barring Service and the dissolution of the Independent Safeguarding Authority; to disregard convictions and cautions for certain abolished offences; to make provision about the release and publication of datasets held by public authorities and to make other provision about freedom of information and the Information Commissioner; to make provision about the trafficking of people for exploitation and about stalking; to repeal certain enactments; and for connected purposes.}} |- | {{|Legal Aid, Sentencing and Punishment of Offenders Act 2012|public|10|01-05-2012|maintained=y|An Act to make provision about legal aid; to make further provision about funding legal services; to make provision about costs and other amounts awarded in civil and criminal proceedings; to make provision about referral fees in connection with the provision of legal services; to make provision about sentencing offenders, including provision about release on licence or otherwise; to make provision about the collection of fines and other sums; to make provision about bail and about remand otherwise than on bail; to make provision about the employment, payment and transfer of persons detained in prisons and other institutions; to make provision about penalty notices for disorderly behaviour and cautions; to make provision about the rehabilitation of offenders; to create new offences of threatening with a weapon in public or on school premises and of causing serious injury by dangerous driving; to create a new offence relating to squatting; to increase penalties for offences relating to scrap metal dealing and to create a new offence relating to payment for scrap metal; and to amend section 76 of the Criminal Justice and Immigration Act 2008.}} |- | {{|Scotland Act 2012|public|11|01-05-2012|maintained=y|An Act to amend the Scotland Act 1998 and make provision about the functions of the Scottish Ministers; and for connected purposes.}} |- | {{|Sunday Trading (London Olympic Games and Paralympic Games) Act 2012|public|12|01-05-2012|maintained=y|An Act to suspend restrictions on Sunday trading hours for the period of the London Olympic Games and Paralympic Games; and for connected purposes.}} }}

== Local acts ==
{{legislationuk|act |- | {{|Kent County Council (Filming on Highways) Act 2010|local|4|27-07-2010|maintained=y|An Act to confer powers on Kent County Council in relation to filming on highways; and for related purposes.}} |- | {{|Allhallows Staining Church Act 2010|local|5|27-07-2010|maintained=y|An Act to remove certain restrictions relating to the use of land comprising the former church of Allhallows Staining, its churchyard, and other adjoining land in the City of London; to make provision for the removal of any human remains from the land and to enable its use for other purposes; and for connected purposes.}} |- | {{|Bank of Ireland (UK) plc Act 2012|local|1|08-03-2012|maintained=y|archived=n|An Act to provide that the statutory right of The Governor and Company of the Bank of Ireland to issue banknotes shall transfer and apply to Bank of Ireland (UK) plc; and for connected purposes.}} |- | {{|London Local Authorities Act 2012|local|2|27-03-2012|maintained=y|archived=n|An Act to confer further powers upon local authorities in London; and for related purposes.}} }}
