= List of acts of the 5th session of the 50th Parliament of the United Kingdom =

This is a list of acts of the 5th session of the 50th Parliament of the United Kingdom, which ran from 31 October 1991 until 16 March 1992.

Acts passed since 1963 are cited by calendar year, as opposed to the convention used for earlier acts of citing the regnal year(s) in which the relevant parliamentary session was held. Each act passed in a respective year is given a chapter number (abbreviated "c."), denoted by Arabic numerals in the case of public general acts, lowercase Roman numerals in the case of local acts, or italicised Arabic numerals in the case of personal acts. These run as separate series.

60 acts of Parliament were passed by the 50th Parliament in its 5th session: 46 public general acts and 14 local acts.

indicates that an act is available to view at legislation.gov.uk, and indicates the location of the original act in the Parliamentary Archives.

== Public general acts ==
{{legislationuk|act |- | {{|Consolidated Fund (No. 3) Act 1991|public|68|19-12-1991|maintained=y|An Act to apply certain sums out of the Consolidated Fund to the service of the years ending on 31st March 1992 and 1993.}} |- | {{|Welsh Development Agency Act 1991|public|69|19-12-1991|maintained=y|An Act to increase the financial limit in section 18(3) of the Welsh Development Agency Act 1975.}} |- | {{|Consolidated Fund Act 1992|public|1|13-02-1992|maintained=y|An Act to apply certain sums out of the Consolidated Fund to the service of the years ending on 31st March 1992 and 1993.}} |- | {{|Stamp Duty (Temporary Provisions) Act 1992|public|2|13-02-1992|maintained=y|An Act to make provision conferring temporary relief from stamp duty and provision for payments by the Commissioners of Inland Revenue in respect of instruments already stamped.}} |- | {{|Severn Bridges Act 1992|public|3|13-02-1992|maintained=y|An Act to provide for the construction of a new bridge over the Severn Estuary between England and Wales and roads leading to the new bridge and associated works; to make provision for the levying of tolls in respect of use of the existing Severn bridge and the new bridge; to make other provision for and in connection with the operation of the bridges; and for connected purposes.}} |- | {{|Social Security Contributions and Benefits Act 1992|public|4|13-02-1992|maintained=y|An Act to consolidate certain enactments relating to social security contributions and benefits with amendments to give effect to recommendations of the Law Commission and the Scottish Law Commission.}} |- | {{|Social Security Administration Act 1992|public|5|13-02-1992|maintained=y|An Act to consolidate certain enactments relating to the administration of social security and related matters with amendments to give effect to recommendations of the Law Commission and the Scottish Law Commission.}} |- | {{|Social Security (Consequential Provisions) Act 1992|public|6|13-02-1992|maintained=y|An Act to make provision for repeals, consequential amendments, transitional and transitory matters and savings in connection with the consolidation of enactments in the Social Security Contributions and Benefits Act 1992 and the Social Security Administration Act 1992 (including provisions to give effect to recommendations of the Law Commission and the Scottish Law Commission).}} |- | {{|Social Security Contributions and Benefits (Northern Ireland) Act 1992|public|7|13-02-1992|maintained=y|An Act to consolidate for Northern Ireland certain enactments relating to social security contributions and benefits, with corrections and minor improvements under the Consolidation of Enactments (Procedure) Act 1949.}} |- | {{|Social Security Administration (Northern Ireland) Act 1992|public|8|13-02-1992|maintained=y|An Act to consolidate for Northern Ireland certain enactments relating to the administration of social security and related matters, with corrections and minor improvements under the Consolidation of Enactments (Procedure) Act 1949.}} |- | {{|Social Security (Consequential Provisions) (Northern Ireland) Act 1992|public|9|13-02-1992|maintained=y|An Act to make provision for repeals, consequential amendments, transitional and transitory matters and savings in connection with the consolidation of enactments in the Social Security Contributions and Benefits (Northern Ireland) Act 1992 and the Social Security Administration (Northern Ireland) Act 1992 with corrections and minor improvements under the Consolidation of Enactments (Procedure) Act 1949.}} |- | {{|Bingo Act 1992|public|10|06-03-1992|maintained=y|An Act to amend the Gaming Act 1968 with respect to bingo; and for connected purposes.}} |- | {{|Aggravated Vehicle-Taking Act 1992|public|11|06-03-1992|maintained=y|An Act to make provision with respect to persons who commit offences under section 12(1) of the Theft Act 1968 in relation to a mechanically propelled vehicle where additional circumstances are present relating to the driving of or damage to the vehicle.}} |- | {{|Taxation of Chargeable Gains Act 1992|public|12|06-03-1992|maintained=y|An Act to consolidate certain enactments relating to the taxation of chargeable gains.}} |- | {{|Further and Higher Education Act 1992|public|13|06-03-1992|maintained=y|An Act to make new provision about further and higher education.}} |- | {{|Local Government Finance Act 1992|public|14|06-03-1992|maintained=y|An Act to provide for certain local authorities to levy and collect a new tax, to be called council tax; to abolish community charges; to make further provision with respect to local government finance (including provision with respect to certain grants by local authorities); and for connected purposes.}} |- | {{|Offshore Safety Act 1992|public|15|06-03-1992|maintained=y|An Act to extend the application of Part I of the Health and Safety at Work etc. Act 1974; to increase the penalties for certain offences under that Part; to confer powers for preserving the security of supplies of petroleum and petroleum products; and for connected purposes.}} |- | {{|Nurses, Midwives and Health Visitors Act 1992|public|16|06-03-1992|maintained=y|An Act to amend the Nurses, Midwives and Health Visitors Act 1979; and for connected purposes.}} |- | {{|Coal Industry Act 1992|public|17|06-03-1992|maintained=y|An Act to make provision for extending the duration of, and increasing the limit on, grants under section 3 of the Coal Industry Act 1987 and to repeal the Coal Mines Regulation Act 1908.}} |- | {{|Licensing (Amendment) (Scotland) Act 1992 |public|18|06-03-1992|maintained=y|An Act to amend the provisions of the Licensing (Scotland) Act 1976 relating to the transfer of licences; and for connected purposes.}} |- | {{|Local Government Act 1992|public|19|06-03-1992|maintained=y|An Act to make new provision, by giving effect to proposals in Cm. 1599 (The Citizen's Charter) relating to publicity and competition, for securing economy, efficiency and effectiveness in the manner in which local authorities carry on certain activities; and to make new provision in relation to local government in England for effecting structural, boundary and electoral changes.}} |- | {{|Finance Act 1992|public|20|16-03-1992|maintained=y|An Act to grant certain duties, to alter other duties, and to amend the law relating to the National Debt and the Public Revenue, and to make further provision in connection with Finance.}} |- | {{|Consolidated Fund (No. 2) Act 1992|public|21|16-03-1992|maintained=y|An Act to apply certain sums out of the Consolidated Fund to the service of the years ending on 31st March 1991 and 1992.}} |- | {{|Appropriation Act 1992|public|22|16-03-1992|maintained=y|An Act to apply certain sums out of the Consolidated Fund to the service of the years ending on 31st March 1992 and 31st March 1993, to appropriate the supplies granted in this Session of Parliament, and to repeal certain Consolidated Fund and Appropriation Acts.}} |- | {{|Access to Neighbouring Land Act 1992|public|23|16-03-1992|maintained=y|An Act to enable persons who desire to carry out works to any land which are reasonably necessary for the preservation of that land to obtain access to neighbouring land in order to do so; and for purposes connected therewith.}} |- | {{|Offshore Safety (Protection Against Victimisation) Act 1992|public|24|16-03-1992|maintained=y|An Act to protect employees working on offshore installations against victimisation when acting as safety representatives or members of safety committees.}} |- | {{|Prison Security Act 1992|public|25|16-03-1992|maintained=y|An Act to make provision for an offence of prison mutiny and for a new offence and new penalties in connection with escapes from prison.}} |- | {{|Tourism (Overseas Promotion) (Wales) Act 1992|public|26|16-03-1992|maintained=y|An Act to enable the Wales Tourist Board to carry on abroad activities to promote tourism to and within Wales.}} |- | {{|Parliamentary Corporate Bodies Act 1992|public|27|16-03-1992|maintained=y|An Act to establish corporate bodies to hold land and perform other functions for the benefit of the Houses of Parliament; to make provision for and in connection with the transfer of certain property, rights and liabilities to those corporate bodies; and for purposes connected therewith.}} |- | {{|Medicinal Products: Prescription by Nurses etc. Act 1992|public|28|16-03-1992|maintained=y|An Act to make provision with respect to medicinal products prescribed or otherwise ordered by registered nurses, midwives and health visitors.}} |- | {{|Still-Birth (Definition) Act 1992|public|29|16-03-1992|maintained=y|An Act to amend the law in respect of the definition of still-birth; to make certain consequential amendments of the law; and for connected purposes.}} |- | {{|Traffic Calming Act 1992|public|30|16-03-1992|maintained=y|An Act to make provision about the carrying out on highways of works affecting the movement of vehicular and other traffic for the purposes of promoting safety and of preserving or improving the environment; and for connected purposes.}} |- | {{|Firearms (Amendment) Act 1992|public|31|16-03-1992|maintained=y|An Act to empower the Secretary of State to extend the period for which firearm and shot gun certificates are granted or renewed.}} |- | {{|Cheques Act 1992|public|32|16-03-1992|maintained=y|An Act to amend the law relating to cheques.}} |- | {{|Social Security (Mortgage Interest Payments) Act 1992|public|33|16-03-1992|maintained=y|An Act to make provision for requiring, in certain cases where interest on a loan secured on land is payable by a person who is entitled, or whose partner, former partner or qualifying associate is entitled, to income support, the applicable amount in respect of which includes a sum in respect of that interest, that a part of the benefits to which any of those persons is entitled under the enactments relating to social security shall be paid directly to the lender and applied towards the discharge of the liability in respect of the interest; and for purposes connected therewith.}} |- | {{|Sexual Offences (Amendment) Act 1992|public|34|16-03-1992|maintained=y|An Act to make provision with respect to anonymity in connection with allegations of, and criminal proceedings relating to, certain sexual offences.}} |- | {{|Timeshare Act 1992|public|35|16-03-1992|maintained=y|An Act to provide for rights to cancel certain agreements about timeshare accommodation.}} |- | {{|Sea Fisheries (Wildlife Conservation) Act 1992|public|36|16-03-1992|maintained=y|An Act to require appropriate Ministers and relevant bodies to have regard to the conservation of flora and fauna in the discharge of their functions under the Sea Fisheries Acts.}} |- | {{|Further and Higher Education (Scotland) Act 1992|public|37|16-03-1992|maintained=y|An Act to make new provision about further and higher education in Scotland; and for connected purposes.}} |- | {{|Education (Schools) Act 1992|public|38|16-03-1992|maintained=y|An Act to make provision with respect to the inspection of schools and with respect to information about schools and their pupils.}} |- | {{|Army Act 1992|public|39|16-03-1992|maintained=y|An Act to provide for members of the Ulster Defence Regiment to cease to be members of that Regiment at the end of June 1992; to provide for the amendment of section 2 of the Armed Forces Act 1966 in relation to service in Northern Ireland; and for connected purposes.}} |- | {{|Friendly Societies Act 1992|public|40|16-03-1992|maintained=y|An Act to make further provision for friendly societies; to provide for the cessation of registration under the Friendly Societies Act 1974; to make provision about disputes involving friendly societies or other bodies registered under the Friendly Societies Act 1974 and about the functions of the Chief Registrar of friendly societies; and for connected purposes.}} |- | {{|Charities Act 1992|public|41|16-03-1992|maintained=y|An Act to amend the Charities Act 1960 and make other provision with respect to charities; to regulate fund-raising activities carried on in connection with charities and other institutions; to make fresh provision with respect to public charitable collections; and for connected purposes.}} |- | {{|Transport and Works Act 1992|public|42|16-03-1992|maintained=y|An Act to provide for the making of orders relating to, or to matters ancillary to, the construction or operation of railways, tramways, trolley vehicle systems, other guided transport systems and inland waterways, and orders relating to, or to matters ancillary to, works interfering with rights of navigation; to make further provision in relation to railways, tramways, trolley vehicle systems and other guided transport systems; to amend certain enactments relating to harbours; and for connected purposes.}} |- | {{|Competition and Service (Utilities) Act 1992|public|43|16-03-1992|maintained=y|An Act to make provision with respect to standards of performance and service to customers in relation to the telecommunications, gas supply, electricity supply, water supply and sewerage service industries; to make provision with respect to complaints by, and disputes with, customers in those industries; to make provision with respect to the powers of the regulators of those industries and with respect to related matters; to make provision with respect to the payment of deposits by customers of certain telecommunications operators; to make further provision for facilitating effective competition in certain of those industries; to make provision with respect to mergers of water or sewerage undertakers; to make provision with respect to compliance orders against public gas suppliers; to make a minor correction in section 98 of the Water Industry Act 1991; and for connected purposes.}} |- | {{|Museums and Galleries Act 1992|public|44|16-03-1992|maintained=y|An Act to establish Boards of Trustees of the National Gallery, the Tate Gallery, the National Portrait Gallery and the Wallace Collection; to transfer property to them and confer functions on them; to make new provision as to transfers to and between the collections of certain museums, galleries and libraries; to make provision for and in connection with the vesting of land in the governing bodies of such institutions; to make provision for the financing of such institutions and of the Museums and Galleries Commission; to make further provision with respect to the giving of indemnities against the loss of, or damage to, objects on loan to certain institutions; to change the name of, and to make further provision with respect to, the British Museum (Natural History); and to amend certain enactments relating to museums, galleries and libraries; and for purposes connected therewith.}} }}

== Local acts ==
{{legislationuk|act |- | {{|London Underground (Safety Measures) Act 1991|local|18|28-11-1991|maintained=y|An Act to empower London Underground Limited, for safety purposes and the relief of passenger congestion, to construct works to improve the underground stations at London Bridge, Holborn and Tottenham Court Road and to acquire lands; and for connected purposes.}} |- | {{|City of Edinburgh District Council Order Confirmation Act 1991|local|19|19-12-1991|maintained=y|An Act to confirm a Provisional Order under the Private Legislation Procedure (Scotland) Act 1936, relating to City of Edinburgh District Council.|po1=City of Edinburgh District Council Order 1991|Provisional Order to repeal and re-enact with amendments certain local statutory provisions in force within the City of Edinburgh District; to confer further powers on the City of Edinburgh District Council; and for other purposes.}} |- | {{|Strathclyde Regional Council Order Confirmation Act 1991|local|20|19-12-1991|maintained=y|An Act to confirm a Provisional Order under the Private Legislation Procedure (Scotland) Act 1936, relating to Strathclyde Regional Council.|po1=Strathclyde Regional Council Order 1991|Provisional Order to re-enact with amendments certain local statutory provisions in force within the Strathclyde Region; to confer further powers on the Strathclyde Regional Council; and for other purposes.}} |- | {{|Torquay Market Act 1991|local|21|19-12-1991|maintained=y|An Act to provide for the dissolution of the Torquay Market Company and the vesting of its undertaking in Torquay Market Company Limited; to repeal the Torquay Market Acts 1855 and 1974; and for other purposes.}} |- | {{|Commercial and Private Bank Act 1991|local|22|19-12-1991|maintained=y|An Act to provide for the transfer to and vesting in Commercial and Private Bank of the undertaking of WPZ Bank (UK) Ltd; and for other purposes.}} |- | {{|London Docklands Railway Act 1991|local|23|19-12-1991|maintained=y|An Act to empower London Regional Transport to construct works and to acquire lands; to confer further powers on London Regional Transport; and for other purposes.}} |- | {{|British Railways Act 1992|local|1|13-02-1992|maintained=y|An Act to empower the British Railways Board to construct works and to acquire land; to confer further powers on the Board; and for other purposes.}} |- | {{|Aberdeen Harbour Order Confirmation Act 1992|local|2|06-03-1992|maintained=y|An Act to confirm a Provisional Order under the Private Legislation Procedure (Scotland) Act 1936, relating to Aberdeen Harbour.|po1=Aberdeen Harbour Order 1992|Provisional Order relating to road traffic offences on harbour roads and the application to those roads of certain provisions of the Traffic Acts.}} |- | {{|London Underground Act 1992|local|3|16-03-1992|maintained=y|An Act to empower London Regional Transport and London Underground Limited to construct works and to acquire lands; to confer further powers on London Regional Transport and London Underground Limited; and for other purposes.}} |- | {{|Aire and Calder Navigation Act 1992|local|4|16-03-1992|maintained=y|An Act to provide for restoration and diversion of a section of the river Aire and of the Aire and Calder Navigation within the St. Aidan's Remainder Opencast Site of the British Coal Corporation; to authorise the Corporation to construct works and to acquire lands; to confer further powers on the Corporation; and for other purposes.}} |- | {{|Avon Weir Act 1992|local|5|16-03-1992|maintained=y|An Act to authorise the Bristol Development Corporation to construct a weir in and across the river Avon (Bristol) and to execute other works; to authorise the Corporation to acquire lands; to provide for the regulation, control and development of part of the river Avon and adjacent land and waterways for purposes including amenity and recreation; to confer further powers on the Corporation; and for other purposes.}} |- | {{|Folkestone Harbour Act 1992|local|6|16-03-1992|maintained=y|An Act to empower Folkestone Properties Limited to reclaim land and construct works at Folkestone Harbour; to make provision with respect to dredging and moorings; and for connected or other purposes.}} |- | {{|Midland Metro Act 1992|local|7|16-03-1992|maintained=y|An Act to empower the West Midlands Passenger Transport Executive to construct additional works for extension of their light rail rapid passenger transport system; to authorise the acquisition of lands for that purpose; to confer further powers upon the Executive; and for other purposes.}} |- | {{|Midland Metro (No. 2) Act 1992|local|8|16-03-1992|maintained=y|An Act to empower the West Midlands Passenger Transport Executive to construct additional works for extension of their light rail rapid passenger transport system and substituted works for parts of that system; to authorise the acquisition of lands for that purpose; to confer further powers upon the Executive; and for other purposes.}} }}
