= List of acts of the 1st session of the 45th Parliament of the United Kingdom =

This is a list of acts of the 1st session of the 45th Parliament of the United Kingdom, which ran from 29 June 1970 until 28 October 1971.

Acts passed since 1963 are cited by calendar year, as opposed to the convention used for earlier acts of citing the regnal year(s) in which the relevant parliamentary session was held. Each act passed in a respective year is given a chapter number (abbreviated "c."), denoted by Arabic numerals in the case of public general acts, lowercase Roman numerals in the case of local acts, or italicised Arabic numerals in the case of personal acts. These run as separate series.

215 acts of Parliament were passed by the 45th Parliament in its 1st session: 89 public general acts and 126 local acts.

indicates that an act is available to view at legislation.gov.uk, and indicates the location of the original act in the Parliamentary Archives.

== Public general acts ==
{{legislationuk|act |- | {{|Appropriation (No. 2) Act 1970|public|48|23-07-1970|An Act to apply a sum out of the Consolidated Fund to the service of the year ending on 31st March 1971, and to appropriate the supplies granted in this Session of Parliament.}} |- | {{|International Monetary Fund Act 1970|public|49|23-07-1970|An Act to enable effect to be given to a proposed increase in the United Kingdom's quota of the International Monetary Fund and to provide for certain loans to that Fund to be made out of the National Loans Fund instead of the Consolidated Fund.}} |- | {{|Fiji Independence Act 1970|public|50|23-07-1970|maintained=y|An Act to make provision for, and in connection with, the attainment by Fiji of fully responsible status within the Commonwealth.}}

|- | {{|National Insurance Act 1970|note1= (Note: The original short title of the National Insurance Act 1970 was the National Insurance (Old persons' and widows' pensions and attendance allowance) Act 1970, but this was amended by the National Insurance Act 1972 on 11 August 1972.)|public|51|23-07-1970|An Act to provide for retirement pension and widow's benefit under the National Insurance Act 1965 for or in respect of persons over pensionable age on 5th July 1948; to reduce from fifty to forty the qualifying age for widow's pension under section 28 of that Act and to relax further the conditions for such a pension and for a wife's retirement pension by virtue of her husband's insurance; to make provision for attendance allowance and the establishment and functions of an Attendance Allowance Board; and for purposes connected with the matters aforesaid.}}

|- | {{|Education (Handicapped Children) Act 1970|public|52|23-07-1970|maintained=y|An Act to make provision, as respects England and Wales, for discontinuing the classification of handicapped children as unsuitable for education at school, and for purposes connected therewith.}} |- | {{|Harbours (Amendment) Act 1970|public|53|23-07-1970|An Act to repeal section 13(1) of the Harbours Act 1964 and impose a limit on future loans under section 11 of that Act.}} |- | {{|Income and Corporation Taxes (No. 2) Act 1970|public|54|17-12-1970|maintained=y|An Act to fix the standard rate of income tax for the year 1971–72 and make an alteration in the marginal relief for persons with small incomes; and to reduce the rate of corporation tax for the financial year 1969.}} |- | {{|Family Income Supplements Act 1970|public|55|17-12-1970|An Act to provide for the payment of a new benefit for certain families with small incomes; and for purposes connected therewith.}} |- | {{|Contingencies Fund Act 1970|public|56|17-12-1970|maintained=y|An Act to make further provision with respect to the Civil Contingencies Fund.}} |- | {{|Town and Country Planning Regulations (London) (Indemnity) Act 1970|public|57|17-12-1970|An Act to grant an indemnity in respect of the delay in laying before Parliament certain regulations made under section 24 of the London Government Act 1963, and to continue in force the provision whereby regulations under that section are subject to annulment in accordance with the Statutory Instruments Act 1946.}} |- | {{|Expiring Laws Continuance Act 1970|public|58|17-12-1970|An Act to continue certain expiring laws.}} |- | {{|Consolidated Fund Act 1971|public|1|17-02-1971|An Act to apply certain sums out of the Consolidated Fund to the service of the years ending on 31st March 1971 and 1972.}} |- | {{|Teaching Council (Scotland) Act 1971|public|2|17-02-1971|maintained=y|An Act to enable the Secretary of State by regulations to secure the payment of fees to the General Teaching Council for Scotland for the renewal of registrations in pursuance of section 6 of the Teaching Council (Scotland) Act 1965, by way of deduction from the salaries of persons employed by education authorities and managers of educational establishments; and for purposes connected therewith.}} |- | {{|Guardianship of Minors Act 1971|public|3|17-02-1971|maintained=y|An Act to consolidate certain enactments relating to the guardianship and custody of minors.}} |- | {{|Copyright (Amendment) Act 1971|public|4|17-02-1971|An Act to amend the Copyright Act 1956 so as to make provision for the subsequent variation by the Performing Right Tribunal of orders made pursuant to section 27 of that Act.}} |- | {{|Air Corporations Act 1971|public|5|17-02-1971|An Act to raise the limits imposed by section 16(1) of the Air Corporations Act 1967 on borrowings by and investment in the British Overseas Airways Corporation.}} |- | {{|Civil Aviation (Declaratory Provisions) Act 1971|public|6|17-02-1971|An Act to make declaratory provision with respect to such a particular flight and series of flights as are mentioned in section 1(3) of the Civil Aviation (Licensing) Act 1960 and with respect to the limitations which may be imposed by virtue of section 3(5) of the Air Corporations Act 1967.}} |- | {{|Local Authorities (Qualification of Members) Act 1971|public|7|17-02-1971|An Act to amend the law relating to the qualification for nomination and election to, and membership of, local authorities in Great Britain.}} |- | {{|Hospital Endowments (Scotland) Act 1971|public|8|17-02-1971|An Act to provide for the constitution of a Scottish Hospital Trust; to make provision for the transfer of endowments to that Trust and for the distribution of the income of those endowments; to extend the powers of investment of the Scottish Hospital Endowments Research Trust; and for connected purposes.}} |- | {{|Rolls-Royce (Purchase) Act 1971|public|9|17-02-1971|maintained=y|An Act to make provision for and in connection with the acquisition for the benefit of the Crown of any part of the undertaking and assets of Rolls-Royce Ltd. or its subsidiaries, and the carrying on of any undertaking so acquired, and for purposes connected therewith.}} |- | {{|Vehicles (Excise) Act 1971|public|10|16-03-1971|maintained=y|An Act to consolidate certain enactments relating to excise duties on mechanically propelled vehicles, and to the licensing and registration of such vehicles with amendments to give effect to recommendations of the Law Commission and the Scottish Law Commission.}} |- | {{|Atomic Energy Authority Act 1971|public|11|16-03-1971|maintained=y|An Act to provide for the transfer to British Nuclear Fuels Limited and The Radiochemical Centre Limited of parts of the undertaking of the United Kingdom Atomic Energy Authority and of property, rights, liabilities and obligations appertaining to those parts of the Authority's undertaking; to make provision with respect to persons employed by the Authority and engaged in those parts of the Authority's undertaking, with respect to the control and finances of the said companies, and with respect to the application of pension schemes maintained by the Authority; to amend the provisions of the Nuclear Installations Act 1965 relating to permits under section 2 of that Act; to make provision relating to factories, offices, building operations and other works on sites in respect of which such permits are in force; to provide for the application of security provisions where such permits are in force and also where companies are designated by the Secretary of State in connection with an agreement relating to the gas centrifuge process for producing enriched uranium; and for purposes connected with those matters.}} |- | {{|Hydrocarbon Oil (Customs & Excise) Act 1971|public|12|16-03-1971|An Act to consolidate the enactments relating to the duties of customs and excise on hydrocarbon oil, petrol substitutes and power methylated spirits.}} |- | {{|Mr. Speaker King's Retirement Act 1971|public|13|30-03-1971|An Act to settle and secure annuities upon the Right Honourable Horace Maybray King, and after his death upon his wife, Una King, in consideration of his eminent services.}} |- | {{|Consolidated Fund (No. 2) Act 1971|public|14|30-03-1971|An Act to apply certain sums out of the Consolidated Fund to the service of the years ending on 31st March 1970, 1971 and 1972.}} |- | {{|Consumer Protection Act 1971|public|15|30-03-1971|An Act to amend section 3 of the Consumer Protection Act 1961.}} |- | {{|Coal Industry Act 1971|public|16|30-03-1971|maintained=y|An Act to provide further finance for the National Coal Board in respect of pit closures and for the making of payments to workers in the coal industry made redundant; to increase the limit of the Board's accumulated deficit and provide for its subsequent alteration by order of the Secretary of State; to enable the Board to borrow money otherwise than in sterling and to join in furnishing technical assistance overseas; to make further provision as to the power of the Secretary of State to give directions to the Board with respect to their activities and accounts; and for purposes connected with the matters aforesaid.}} |- | {{|Industry Act 1971|public|17|08-04-1971|An Act to repeal the Industrial Reorganisation Corporation Act 1966 and dissolve the Industrial Reorganisation Corporation; to terminate the power to make industrial investment schemes under the Industrial Expansion Act 1968 otherwise than for the purpose of revoking or varying any such scheme made before the passing of this Act; and for purposes connected with those matters.}} |- | {{|Land Commission (Dissolution) Act 1971|public|18|08-04-1971|An Act to abolish betterment levy and dissolve the Land Commission; and for purposes connected therewith.}} |- | {{|Carriage of Goods by Sea Act 1971|public|19|08-04-1971|maintained=y|An Act to amend the law with respect to the carriage of goods by sea.}} |- | {{|Mines Management Act 1971|public|20|08-04-1971|maintained=y|An Act to amend the law as to the management and control of mines by making provision with respect to the appointment of persons to assist the manager of a mine in the discharge of his statutory responsibilities, and with respect to under-managers, and for purposes connected therewith.}} |- | {{|Oil in Navigable Waters Act 1971|public|21|08-04-1971|maintained=y|An Act to amend the Oil in Navigable Waters Acts 1955 and 1963 and section 5 of the Continental Shelf Act 1964; to make further provision for preventing pollution of the sea by oil; and for purposes connected therewith.}} |- | {{|Animals Act 1971|public|22|12-05-1971|maintained=y|An Act to make provision with respect to civil liability for damage done by animals and with respect to the protection of livestock from dogs; and for purposes connected with those matters.}} |- | {{|Courts Act 1971|public|23|12-05-1971|maintained=y|An Act to make further provision as respects the Supreme Court (Note: Although the term "Supreme Court" was amended to "Senior Courts" in each place it occurs in the Act by the Constitutional Reform Act 2005 on 1 October 2009, the long title was exempted from amendment.) and county courts, judges and juries, to establish a Crown Court as part of the Supreme Court to try indictments and exercise certain other jurisdiction, to abolish courts of assize and certain other courts and to deal with their jurisdiction and other consequential matters, and to amend in other respects the law about courts and court proceedings.}} |- | {{|Coinage Act 1971|public|24|12-05-1971|maintained=y|An Act to consolidate, so far as they are part of the law of the United Kingdom, the Coinage Acts 1870 to 1946 and certain other enactments relating to coinage, with amendments to give effect to recommendations of the Law Commission and the Scottish Law Commission.}} |- | {{|Administration of Estates Act 1971|public|25|12-05-1971|maintained=y|An Act to provide for the recognition, without resealing, of certain grants of administration and confirmations throughout the United Kingdom; to allow for the inclusion of real estate in any part of the United Kingdom in the inventory of the estate of a person dying domiciled in Scotland; to amend the law with respect to the grant of administration by the High Court and resealing by that Court of administration granted outside the United Kingdom and to exempt from stamp duty guarantees given under the law so amended; to make provision with respect to the duties and rights of personal representatives; and for connected purposes.}} |- | {{|Betting, Gaming and Lotteries (Amendment) Act 1971|public|26|12-05-1971|An Act to amend the provisions of the Betting, Gaming and Lotteries Act 1963 relating to days on which betting is permitted on tracks; and for connected purposes.}} |- | {{|Powers of Attorney Act 1971|public|27|12-05-1971|maintained=y|An Act to make new provision in relation to powers of attorney and the delegation by trustees of their trusts, powers and discretions.}} |- | {{|Rent (Scotland) Act 1971|public|28|12-05-1971|maintained=y|An Act to consolidate in relation to Scotland the Rent and Mortgage Interest Restrictions Acts 1920 to 1939, the Rent of Furnished Houses Control (Scotland) Act 1943, the Landlord and Tenant (Rent Control) Act 1949, Part II of the Housing (Repairs and Rents) (Scotland) Act 1954, the Rent Act 1957, the Rent Act 1965 (except Part III thereof), Part IV of the Housing (Scotland) Act 1969 and other related enactments.}} |- | {{|National Savings Bank Act 1971|public|29|12-05-1971|maintained=y|An Act to consolidate certain enactments relating to the National Savings Bank, with amendments to give effect to recommendations of the Law Commission and the Scottish Law Commission.}} |- | {{|Unsolicited Goods and Services Act 1971|public|30|12-05-1971|maintained=y|An Act to make provision for the greater protection of persons receiving unsolicited goods, and to amend the law with respect to charges for entries in directories.}} |- | {{|Interest on Damages (Scotland) Act 1971|public|31|12-05-1971|maintained=y|An Act to amend the Interest on Damages (Scotland) Act 1958 by extending the power of the courts to order payment of interest on damages.}} |- | {{|Attachment of Earnings Act 1971|public|32|12-05-1971|maintained=y|An Act to consolidate the enactments relating to the attachment of earnings as a means of enforcing the discharge of monetary obligations.}} |- | {{|Armed Forces Act 1971|public|33|27-05-1971|maintained=y|An Act to continue the Army Act 1955 and the Air Force Act 1955, to limit the duration of the Naval Discipline Act 1957, and to amend those Acts and other enactments relating to the armed forces.}} |- | {{|Water Resources Act 1971|public|34|27-05-1971|An Act to make further provision with respect to the discharge of water by or by agreement with river authorities, and for connected purposes.}} |- | {{|Dangerous Litter Act 1971|public|35|27-05-1971|An Act to amend the Litter Act 1958 so as to make better provision for the abatement of dangerous litter; to empower local authorities to promote the abatement of litter by means of publicity; and for purposes connected therewith.}} |- | {{|Motor Vehicles (Passenger Insurance) Act 1971|public|36|27-05-1971|An Act to amend the Road Traffic Act 1960 so as to require users of motor vehicles to be insured in respect of liability for death or bodily injury to passengers; and for connected purposes.}} |- | {{|Welsh National Opera Company Act 1971|public|37|27-05-1971|maintained=y|An Act to make further provision for contributions by local authorities in Wales (including Monmouthshire) towards the expenses of the Welsh National Opera Company.}} |- | {{|Misuse of Drugs Act 1971|public|38|27-05-1971|maintained=y|An Act to make new provision with respect to dangerous or otherwise harmful drugs and related matters, and for purposes connected therewith.}} |- | {{|Rating Act 1971|public|39|27-05-1971|maintained=y|An Act to extend the provisions relating to the exemption from rating of land and buildings used in connection with agriculture.}} |- | {{|Fire Precautions Act 1971|public|40|27-05-1971|maintained=y|An Act to make further provision for the protection of persons from fire risks; and for purposes connected therewith.}} |- | {{|Highways Act 1971|public|41|01-07-1971|maintained=y|An Act to make further provision with respect to highways, streets and bridges in England and Wales, including provisions with respect to means of access to premises from highways, provisions amending section 49 of the Public Health Act 1961, provisions authorising the provision of picnic sites and public conveniences for the benefit of users of certain highways, provisions authorising the provision of facilities for purposes connected with the transport of goods by road, provisions amending the law about the recording of public rights of way, and related provisions amending the law of town and country planning.}} |- | {{|Education (Scotland) Act 1971|public|42|01-07-1971|An Act to re-enact with modifications certain provisions relating to free education; to restore to education authorities the power to charge fees in a limited number of schools; to make provision in respect of fees to be charged for outwith-area pupils; and for connected purposes.}} |- | {{|Law Reform (Miscellaneous Provisions) Act 1971|public|43|01-07-1971|maintained=y|An Act to extend in certain cases the time limit for bringing legal proceedings where damages are claimed which consist of or include damages for personal injuries or in respect of a person's death, and to amend accordingly the Limitation Act 1963; to provide that in assessing damages for widows in actions arising from the death of their husbands, remarriage and prospects of remarriage shall be left out of account; to repeal section 19 of the Administration of Justice Act 1965; and for purposes connected therewith.}} |- | {{|Nullity of Marriage Act 1971|public|44|01-07-1971|An Act to restate, with certain alterations, the grounds on which a marriage is void or voidable and the bars to the grant of a decree of nullity on the ground that a marriage is voidable; to alter the effect of decrees of nullity in respect of voidable marriages; and to abolish certain remaining bars to the grant of matrimonial relief.}} |- | {{|Redemption of Standard Securities (Scotland) Act 1971|public|45|01-07-1971|maintained=y|An Act to amend the provisions of the Conveyancing and Feudal Reform (Scotland) Act 1970 relating to the redemption of standard securities; to make provision as respects Scotland in relation to the operation of section 89 of the Companies Act 1948; and for connected purposes.}} |- | {{|Shipbuilding Industry Act 1971|public|46|01-07-1971|An Act to amend section 7 of the Shipbuilding Industry Act 1967 by raising the limit on the liability which the Secretary of State may assume in respect of guarantees under the section.}} |- | {{|Wild Creatures and Forest Laws Act 1971|public|47|01-07-1971|maintained=y|An Act to abolish certain rights of Her Majesty to wild creatures and certain related rights and franchises; to abrogate the forest law (subject to exceptions); and to repeal enactments relating to those rights and franchises and to forests and the forest law; and for connected purposes.}} |- | {{|Criminal Damage Act 1971|public|48|14-07-1971|maintained=y|An Act to revise the law of England and Wales as to offences of damage to property, and to repeal or amend as respects the United Kingdom certain enactments relating to such offences; and for connected purposes.}} |- | {{|Rural Water Supplies and Sewerage Act 1971|public|49|14-07-1971|maintained=y|An Act to remove the limit imposed by subsection (5) of section 1 of the Rural Water Supplies and Sewerage Act 1944, as amended, on contributions under that section towards the expenses of local authorities in England and Wales.}} |- | {{|National Insurance Act 1971|public|50|14-07-1971|An Act to amend the provisions of the National Insurance Acts 1965 to 1970, the National Insurance (Industrial Injuries) Acts 1965 to 1969 and the Industrial Injuries and Diseases (Old Cases) Acts 1967 and 1969 as to contributions and benefits; to make provision for invalidity benefit for the chronic sick and for a retirement pension and age addition for certain persons over the age of eighty; to make new provision in relation to polygamous marriages for the purposes of any of the said Acts or of the Family Allowances Act 1965; and for purposes connected with those matters.}} |- | {{|Investment and Building Grants Act 1971|public|51|27-07-1971|maintained=y|An Act to preclude, subject to certain exceptions, the making of grants under Part I of the Industrial Development Act 1966 in respect of expenditure incurred on or after 27th October 1970; to make further provision with respect to grants under section 3 of the Local Employment Act 1960; and for connected purposes.}} |- | {{|Statute Law (Repeals) Act 1971|public|52|27-07-1971|maintained=y|An Act to promote the reform of the statute law by the repeal, in accordance with recommendations of the Law Commission and the Scottish Law Commission, of certain enactments which are no longer of practical utility.}} |- | {{|Recognition of Divorces and Legal Separations Act 1971|public|53|27-07-1971|An Act to amend the law relating to the recognition of divorces and legal separations.}} |- | {{|Land Registration and Land Charges Act 1971|public|54|27-07-1971|maintained=y|An Act to amend the Land Registration Acts 1925 to 1966; to amend the Land Charges Act 1925 and related enactments; and for connected purposes.}} |- | {{|Law Reform (Jurisdiction in Delict) (Scotland) Act 1971|public|55|27-07-1971|An Act to extend the jurisdiction of the Court of Session and the sheriff court in Scotland in proceedings founded on delict.}} |- | {{|Pensions (Increase) Act 1971|public|56|27-07-1971|maintained=y|An Act to replace the Pensions (Increase) Acts 1920 to 1969 and make further provision for increases and supplements to be paid on certain pensions and related benefits.}} |- | {{|Pool Competitions Act 1971|public|57|27-07-1971|An Act to make provisions as respects certain competitions conducted by registered pool promoters.}} |- | {{|Sheriff Courts (Scotland) Act 1971|public|58|27-07-1971|maintained=y|An Act to amend the law with respect to sheriff courts in Scotland, and for purposes connected therewith.}} |- | {{|Merchant Shipping (Oil Pollution) Act 1971|public|59|27-07-1971|maintained=y|An Act to make provision with respect to civil liability for oil pollution by merchant ships; and for connected purposes.}} |- | {{|Prevention of Oil Pollution Act 1971|public|60|27-07-1971|maintained=y|An Act to consolidate the Oil in Navigable Waters Acts 1955 to 1971 and section 5 of the Continental Shelf Act 1964.}} |- | {{|Mineral Workings (Offshore Installations) Act 1971|public|61|27-07-1971|maintained=y|An Act to provide for the safety, health and welfare of persons on installations concerned with the underwater exploitation and exploration of mineral resources in the waters in or surrounding the United Kingdom, and generally for the safety of such installations and the prevention of accidents on or near them.}} |- | {{|Tribunals and Inquiries Act 1971|public|62|27-07-1971|maintained=y|An Act to consolidate the Tribunals and Inquiries Acts 1958 and 1966 as amended.}} |- | {{|Anguilla Act 1971|public|63|27-07-1971|An Act to make further provision with respect to Anguilla.}} |- | {{|Diplomatic and other Privileges Act 1971|public|64|27-07-1971|maintained=y|An Act to make further provision with respect to diplomatic and related privileges.}} |- | {{|Licensing (Abolition of State Management) Act 1971|public|65|27-07-1971|An Act to remove the restriction on the sale and supply, otherwise than by the Secretary of State, of intoxicating liquor in the Carlisle district or of exciseable liquor in the State management districts in Scotland; to provide for the disposal of property held by the Secretary of State for the purposes of Part V of the Licensing Act 1964 or Part V of the Licensing (Scotland) Act 1959 and for the repeal of those provisions.}} |- | {{|Friendly Societies Act 1971|public|66|27-07-1971|maintained=y|An Act to amend the law relating to societies and branches registered under the Friendly Societies Act 1896, to make other amendments to facilitate the consolidation of the Friendly Societies Acts 1896 to 1968, and for purposes connected therewith.}} |- | {{|Appropriation Act 1971|public|67|05-08-1971|An Act to apply a sum out of the Consolidated Fund to the service of the year ending on 31st March 1972, and to appropriate the further supplies granted in this Session of Parliament.}} |- | {{|Finance Act 1971|public|68|05-08-1971|maintained=y|An Act to grant certain duties, to alter other duties, and to amend the law relating to the National Debt and the Public Revenue, and to make further provision in connection with Finance.}} |- | {{|Medicines Act 1971|public|69|05-08-1971|maintained=y|An Act to make further provision as to the fees payable for the purposes of Part II of the Medicines Act 1968.}} |- | {{|Hijacking Act 1971|public|70|05-08-1971|maintained=y|An Act to give effect to the Convention for the Suppression of Unlawful Seizure of Aircraft; and for connected purposes.}} |- | {{|Mineral Workings Act 1971|public|71|05-08-1971|maintained=y|An Act to make further provision in relation to contributions to and payments out of the Ironstone Restoration Fund and to abolish the Advisory Committee on Ironstone Restoration.}} |- | {{|Industrial Relations Act 1971|public|72|05-08-1971|An Act to amend the law relating to employers and workers and to organisations of employers and organisations of workers; to provide for the establishment of a National Industrial Relations Court and for extending the jurisdiction of industrial tribunals; to provide for the appointment of a Chief Registrar of Trade Unions and Employers' Associations, and of assistant registrars, and for establishing a Commission on Industrial Relations as a statutory body; and for purposes connected with those matters.}} |- | {{|Social Security Act 1971|public|73|05-08-1971|An Act to amend the law relating to benefit under the Ministry of Social Security Act 1966 and to certain benefits under the National Insurance Act 1965 and the National Insurance (Industrial Injuries) Act 1965; to increase the penalties for failure to pay contributions under the said Acts of 1965; to abolish local advisory committees under the said Act of 1966; and for purposes connected with those matters.}} |- | {{|Education (Milk) Act 1971|public|74|05-08-1971|An Act to restrict the duty of education authorities to provide milk for pupils at educational establishments maintained by them or under their management and make further provision with respect to their power to do so; to restrict their power to secure provision of milk for pupils at other educational establishments; and for purposes connected therewith.}} |- | {{|Civil Aviation Act 1971|public|75|05-08-1971|maintained=y|An Act to establish a public authority concerned with civil aviation and to make provision as to the functions of the authority; to make further provision for regulating civil aviation; to establish a corporation with functions which include the function of controlling the activities of the British Overseas Airways Corporation and the British European Airways Corporation and to authorise in certain circumstances the dissolution of either of those Corporations; and for purposes connected with the matters aforesaid.}} |- | {{|Housing Act 1971|public|76|05-08-1971|An Act to increase the amount of financial assistance available under Parts I and II of the Housing Act 1969, and under certain provisions of the Housing (Financial Provisions) (Scotland) Act 1968 and of the Housing (Scotland) Act 1969, as respects expenditure incurred in local government areas wholly or partly within development areas, or intermediate areas under section 1 of the Local Employment Act 1970.}} |- | {{|Immigration Act 1971|public|77|28-10-1971|maintained=y|An Act to amend and replace the present immigration laws, to make certain related changes in the citizenship law and enable help to be given to those wishing to return abroad, and for purposes connected therewith.}} |- | {{|Town and Country Planning Act 1971|public|78|28-10-1971|maintained=y|An Act to consolidate certain enactments relating to town and country planning in England and Wales with amendments to give effect to recommendations of the Law Commission.}} }}

== Local acts ==
{{legislationuk|act |- | {{|Aberdeen Extension Order Confirmation Act 1970|local|31|23-07-1970|An Act to confirm a Provisional Order under the Private Legislation Procedure (Scotland) Act 1936, relating to Aberdeen Extension.|po1=Aberdeen Extension Order 1970|Provisional Order to extend the boundaries of the city and royal burgh of Aberdeen and for other purposes.}} |- | {{|Forth Ports Authority Order Confirmation Act 1970|local|32|23-07-1970|An Act to confirm a Provisional Order under the Private Legislation Procedure (Scotland) Act 1936, relating to the Forth Ports Authority.|po1=Forth Ports Authority Order 1970|Provisional Order to authorise the Forth Ports Authority to construct additional works; and for other purposes.}} |- | {{|Mallaig Harbour Order Confirmation Act 1970|local|33|23-07-1970|An Act to confirm a Provisional Order under the Private Legislation Procedure (Scotland) Act 1936, relating to Mallaig Harbour.|po1=Mallaig Harbour Order 1970|Provisional Order to authorise the Mallaig Harbour Authority to carry out works for the improvement of the harbour of Mallaig and to borrow money; and for other purposes.}} |- | {{|Bank of Scotland Order Confirmation Act 1970|local|34|23-07-1970|An Act to confirm a Provisional Order under the Private Legislation Procedure (Scotland) Act 1936, relating to the Bank of Scotland.|po1=Bank of Scotland Order 1970|Provisional Order to provide for the transfer to the Governor and Company of the Bank of Scotland of the business and undertaking of The British Linen Bank and for other purposes.}} |- | {{|Fife County Council Order Confirmation Act 1970|local|35|23-07-1970|An Act to confirm a Provisional Order under the Private Legislation Procedure (Scotland) Act 1936, relating to Fife County Council.|po1=Fife County Council Order 1970|Provisional Order to confer on the County Council of the county of Fife further powers with respect to the finances of the county; to make further provision for the investment of the superannuation fund maintained by the County Council; and for other purposes.}} |- | {{|Midlothian County Council Order Confirmation Act 1970|local|36|23-07-1970|An Act to confirm a Provisional Order under the Private Legislation Procedure (Scotland) Act 1936, relating to Midlothian County Council.|po1=Midlothian County Council Order 1970|Provisional Order to confer further powers on the county council of the county of Midlothian in relation to the finances of the said county; to make further provision for the investment of moneys forming part of the superannuation fund maintained by the said county council; and for other purposes.}} |- | {{|West Lothian County Council Order Confirmation Act 1970|local|37|23-07-1970|An Act to confirm a Provisional Order under the Private Legislation Procedure (Scotland) Act 1936, relating to West Lothian County Council.|po1=West Lothian County Council Order 1970|Provisional Order to confer on the county council of the county of West Lothian further powers with respect to the finances of the county; and for other purposes.}} |- | {{|Lake Menteith Fisheries Order Confirmation Act 1970|local|38|23-07-1970|An Act to confirm a Provisional Order under the Private Legislation Procedure (Scotland) Act 1936, relating to the Lake of Menteith Fisheries.|po1=Lake of Menteith Fisheries Order 1970|Provisional Order to confer on the Lake of Menteith Fisheries Limited powers with respect to fishings in the Lake of Menteith; and for other purposes.}} |- | {{|Barclays Bank Trust Company Act 1970|local|39|23-07-1970|An Act to transfer to Barclays Bank Trust Company Limited the executor and trustee business of Barclays Bank Limited; and for other purposes.}} |- | {{|Brighton Corporation Act 1970|local|40|23-07-1970|An Act to authorise the mayor, aldermen and burgesses of the county borough of Brighton to construct street works and other works and to acquire lands for those purposes; and for other purposes.}} |- | {{|North Riding County Council Act 1970|local|41|23-07-1970|An Act to confer further powers on the county council of the North Riding of the county of York in relation to the finances of the county; and for other purposes.}} |- | {{|Blackburn Corporation Act 1970|local|42|23-07-1970|An Act to confer further powers on the mayor, aldermen and burgesses of the county borough of Blackburn in relation to the finances of the borough; and for other purposes.}} |- | {{|Kent County Council Act 1970|local|43|23-07-1970|An Act to confer further powers on the Kent County Council in relation to lands and the local government and finances of the county; and for other purposes.}} |- | {{|Williams & Glyn's Bank Act 1970|local|44|23-07-1970|An Act to provide for the transfer to Williams & Glyn's Bank Limited of the undertakings of Glyn, Mills & Co., The National Bank Limited and Williams Deacon's Bank Limited; and for other purposes incidental thereto and consequential thereupon.}} |- | {{|Cumberland County Council Act 1970|local|45|23-07-1970|An Act to confer further powers on the Cumberland County Council and on local authorities in the administrative county of Cumberland in relation to lands, development and the local government, improvement and finances of the county; and for other purposes.}} |- | {{|Gloucestershire County Council Act 1970|local|46|23-07-1970|An Act to confer further powers on the Gloucestershire County Council in relation to the finances of the county; and for other purposes.}} |- | {{|Salop County Council Act 1970|local|47|23-07-1970|An Act to confer further powers on the Salop County Council with regard to finance and local government; and for other purposes.}} |- | {{|West Sussex County Council Act 1970|local|48|23-07-1970|An Act to confer further powers on the West Sussex County Council in relation to the finances of the county; and for other purposes.}} |- | {{|Staffordshire County Council Act 1970|local|49|23-07-1970|An Act to confer further powers on the Staffordshire County Council in relation to the finances of the county; to confer further powers on the county council and on local authorities and other public authorities with regard to the superannuation of employees and to the investment of superannuation funds; and for other purposes.}} |- | {{|Northumberland County Council Act 1970|local|50|23-07-1970|An Act to confer further powers on the Northumberland County Council in relation to industry, lands and highways and the local government, improvement, health and finances of the county; and for other purposes.}} |- | {{|Manchester Corporation Act 1970|local|51|23-07-1970|An Act to confer further powers upon the lord mayor, aldermen and citizens of the city of Manchester and to make further provision with regard to the local government, lands and finances of the city and with regard to pensions; and for other purposes.}} |- | {{|Whitehaven Harbour Act 1970|local|52|23-07-1970|An Act to authorise the Whitehaven Harbour Commissioners to construct further works; and for other purposes.}} |- | {{|Tor Bay Harbour Act 1970|local|53|23-07-1970|An Act to re-enact with amendments certain enactments relating to the Brixham, Paignton and Torquay harbours; to extend the limits of the harbours and to provide for one harbour for Tor Bay; to confer further powers for the administration, management and control of the harbour upon the mayor, aldermen and burgesses of the county borough of Torbay; and for other purposes.}} |- | {{|West Hertfordshire Main Drainage Act 1970|local|54|23-07-1970|An Act to confer further powers upon the West Hertfordshire Main Drainage Authority; to extend the sewerage district of that Authority; and for other purposes.}} |- | {{|Greater London Council (Money) Act 1970|local|55|23-07-1970|An Act to regulate the expenditure on capital account and on lending to other persons by the Greater London Council during the financial period from 1st April 1970 to 30th September 1971; and for other purposes.}} |- | {{|Aberdeen Corporation Order Confirmation Act 1970|local|56|17-12-1970|An Act to confirm a Provisional Order under the Private Legislation Procedure (Scotland) Act 1936, relating to Aberdeen Corporation.|po1=Aberdeen Corporation Order 1970|Provisional Order to confer further powers on the Corporation of the city of Aberdeen in relation to the finances of the said city; and for other purposes.}} |- | {{|Glasgow Corporation (Works &c.) Order Confirmation Act 1970|local|57|17-12-1970|An Act to confirm a Provisional Order under the Private Legislation Procedure (Scotland) Act 1936, relating to Glasgow Corporation (Works &c.).|po1=Glasgow Corporation (Works &c.) Order 1970|Provisional Order to authorise the Corporation of the city of Glasgow to acquire lands and to construct works; to confer powers on the Corporation to require fire precautions in certain buildings used as places of public assembly; and for other purposes.}} |- | {{|Stirling County Council Order Confirmation Act 1970|local|58|17-12-1970|An Act to confirm a Provisional Order under the Private Legislation Procedure (Scotland) Act 1936, relating to Stirling County Council.|po1=Stirling County Council Order 1970|Provisional Order to confer on the County Council of the county of Stirling further powers with respect to the finances of the county; to make further provision for the investment of the superannuation fund maintained by the County Council; and for other purposes.}} |- | {{|Dundee Corporation Order Confirmation Act 1970|local|59|17-12-1970|An Act to confirm a Provisional Order under the Private Legislation Procedure (Scotland) Act 1936, relating to Dundee Corporation.|po1=Dundee Corporation Order 1970|Provisional Order to confer further powers on the Corporation of the city and royal burgh of Dundee in relation to the finances of the said city; to make further provision for the borrowing of moneys; to make further provision for the investment of moneys forming part of the superannuation fund maintained by the said Corporation; and for other purposes.}} |- | {{|Edinburgh Corporation Order Confirmation Act 1970|local|60|17-12-1970|An Act to confirm a Provisional Order under the Private Legislation Procedure (Scotland) Act 1936, relating to Edinburgh Corporation.|po1=Edinburgh Corporation Order 1970|Provisional Order to authorise the Corporation of the city of Edinburgh to acquire lands; to construct a new sewer within the city; to abstract water from the Water of Leith in connection with refuse disposal within the city; to borrow money for the purposes of the Order; and for other purposes.}} |- | {{|Nottinghamshire County Council Act 1970|local|61|17-12-1970|An Act to confer further powers on the Nottinghamshire County Council in relation to the finances of the county; and for other purposes.}} |- | {{|Preston Corporation Act 1970|local|62|17-12-1970|An Act to confer further powers upon the mayor, aldermen and burgesses of the borough of Preston with regard to the finances of the borough; and for other purposes.}} |- | {{|Lindsey County Council Act 1970|local|63|17-12-1970|An Act to confer further powers on the county council of Lincoln, Parts of Lindsey, in relation to the finances of the county; and for other purposes.}} |- | {{|Northampton Corporation Act 1970|local|64|17-12-1970|An Act to confer further powers on the mayor, aldermen and burgesses of the county borough of Northampton; to establish and undertaking for the supply of heat; to make further provision for the finances, improvement and local government of the borough; and for other purposes.}} |- | {{|Pembrokeshire Water Board Act 1970|local|65|17-12-1970|An Act to confer further powers on the Pembrokeshire Water Board in relation to the finances of the Board; and for other purposes.}} |- | {{|Port of Tyne Act 1970|local|66|17-12-1970|An Act to empower the Port of Tyne Authority to transfer the Market Place Ferry undertaking at North Shields and South Shields; to make certain provision for enabling the service of that undertaking to be reduced or abandoned; and for other purposes.}} |- | {{|Barry Corporation Act 1970|local|67|17-12-1970|An Act to confer further powers on the mayor, aldermen and burgesses of the borough of Barry; to make better provision with respect to the improvement, local government and finances of the borough; and for other purposes.}} |- | {{|Gateshead Corporation Act 1970|local|68|17-12-1970|An Act to confer further powers on the mayor, aldermen and burgesses of the county borough of Gateshead in relation to the finances of the county borough; and for other purposes.}} |- | {{|City of London (Various Powers) Act 1970|local|69|17-12-1970|An Act to make further provision with respect to superannuation, administration and the borrowing of money by the Corporation of London; and for other purposes.}} |- | {{|Gloucester Corporation Act 1970|local|70|17-12-1970|An Act to confer further powers on the mayor, aldermen and citizens of the city of Gloucester in relation to the finances of the city; and for other purposes.}} |- | {{|West End Baptist Church, Hammersmith Act 1970|local|71|17-12-1970|An Act to authorise the sale of the burial ground attached to or comprised in the West End Baptist Church, Hammersmith and premises appurtenant thereto; to authorise the use of the said burial ground for building or otherwise; and for purposes incidental thereto.}} |- | {{|East Suffolk County Council Act 1970|local|72|17-12-1970|An Act to confer further powers on the East Suffolk County Council in relation to lands and the local government, improvement and finances of the administrative county of East Suffolk; to make further provision for the superannuation of employees; and for other purposes.}} |- | {{|Liverpool Corporation Act 1970|local|73|17-12-1970|An Act to confer further powers on the lord mayor, aldermen and citizens of the city of Liverpool in relation to the finances of the city; and for other purposes.}} |- | {{|Southend-on-Sea Corporation Act 1970|local|74|17-12-1970|An Act to confer further powers upon the mayor, aldermen and burgesses of the county borough of Southend-on-Sea; to make further provision with regard to highways and finance; and for other purposes.}} |- | {{|British Railways Act 1970|local|75|17-12-1970|An Act to empower the British Railways Board to construct a work; to extend the time for the compulsory purchase of certain lands and the completion of a certain work; to confer further powers on the Board; and for other purposes.}} |- | {{|Greater London Council (General Powers) Act 1970|local|76|17-12-1970|An Act to confer further powers upon the Greater London Council and other authorities; and for other purposes.}} |- | {{|Monmouthshire County Council Act 1970|local|77|17-12-1970|An Act to confer further powers on the Monmouthshire County Council and on local, highway and other authorities in the administrative county of Monmouth in relation to lands, amenities, highways and the local government, improvement, health and finances of the county and of the boroughs and districts therein; and for other purposes.}} |- | {{|Port of London Act 1970|local|78|17-12-1970|An Act to make further provision in relation to the discontinuance of operation by the Port of London Authority of certain works; and for other purposes.}} |- | {{|Western Valleys (Monmouthshire) Sewerage Board Act 1970|local|79|17-12-1970|An Act to confer further powers upon the Western Valleys (Monmouthshire) Sewerage Board; to amend certain local enactments relating to the Board's undertaking; and for other purposes.}} |- | {{|Bootle Corporation Act 1970|local|80|17-12-1970|An Act to confer further powers upon the mayor, aldermen and burgesses of the borough of Bootle; to empower them to establish an undertaking for the supply of heat; to make further provision for the improvement, health, local government and finances of the borough; and for other purposes.}} |- | {{|Bridge Street Baptist Church, Banbury Act 1970|local|81|17-12-1970|An Act to authorise the sale of the Baptist Church at Bridge Street in the borough of Banbury and of the burial ground, land and premises appurtenant thereto; to authorise the demolition of the said church and other premises and the use for other purposes of the site thereof and the said burial ground and land; and for purposes incidental thereto.}} |- | {{|Grimsby Corporation Act 1970|local|82|17-12-1970|An Act to empower the mayor, aldermen and burgesses of the county borough of Grimsby to make provision with regard to the use for recreational purposes of parts of Grimsby Haven, West Haven and the river Freshney, and to make further provision with regard to streets and the local government, health, improvement and finances of the borough; to make further provision for the superannuation of employees; and for other purposes.}} |- | {{|Oxfordshire County Council Act 1970|local|83|17-12-1970|An Act to confer further powers on the Oxfordshire County Council in relation to lands and highways and the local government, improvement and finance of the county; to make further provision for the superannuation of employees of the Council and local authorities in the county; and for other purposes.}} |- | {{|Reading Corporation Act 1970|local|84|17-12-1970|An Act to confer further powers upon the mayor, aldermen and burgesses of the county borough of Reading; to make further provision with regard to the health, local government, welfare, improvement and finances of the borough; and for other purposes.}} |- | {{|Wiltshire County Council Act 1970|local|85|17-12-1970|An Act to confer further powers on the Wiltshire County Council and local authorities in the administrative county of Wilts in relation to lands and highways and the local government, improvement and finances of the county; to make further provision for the superannuation of employees; and for other purposes.}} |- | {{|Glasgow Corporation (Finance &c.) Order Confirmation Act 1971|local|1|17-02-1971|An Act to confirm a Provisional Order under the Private Legislation Procedure (Scotland) Act 1936, relating to Glasgow Corporation (Finance &c.).|po1=Glasgow Corporation (Finance &c.) Order 1971|Provisional Order to confer further powers on the Corporation of the city of Glasgow in relation to the finances of the city; to make provision for the execution of documents; and for other purposes.}} |- | {{|Paisley Corporation (Cart Navigation) Order Confirmation Act 1971|local|2|17-02-1971|An Act to confirm a Provisional Order under the Private Legislation Procedure (Scotland) Act 1936, relating to Paisley Corporation (Cart Navigation).|po1=Paisley Corporation (Cart Navigation) Order 1971|Provisional Order to authorise the partial abandonment of the Cart Navigation by the provost, magistrates and councillors of the Burgh of Paisley; to extinguish rights of navigation over part of the said Navigation; and for purposes connected therewith.}} |- | {{|Ministry of Housing and Local Government Provisional Orders Confirmation (Melton Mowbray and Sheffield) Act 1971|local|3|17-02-1971|An Act to confirm Provisional Orders of the Minister of Housing and Local Government relating to the urban district of Melton Mowbray and the city of Sheffield.|po1=Urban District of Melton Mowbray Order 1970|po1note1= (Note: Although passed in 1971, the short title specifies the year 1970.)|Provisional Order amending a Local Act.|po2=Sheffield Order 1970|po2note1=|Provisional Order amending Local Enactments.}} |- | {{|Amoco (U.K.) Act 1971|local|4|17-02-1971|An Act to empower Amoco (U.K.) Limited to construct works and to acquire lands; and for other purposes.}} |- | {{|Falmouth Container Terminal Act 1971|local|5|17-02-1971|An Act to empower Falmouth Container Terminal Limited to construct works; and for other purposes.}} |- | {{|National Trust Act 1971|local|6|17-02-1971|An Act to amend the constitution of the National Trust for Places of Historic Interest or Natural Beauty; to amend the National Trust Acts 1907 to 1953; to confer further powers on the said National Trust; and for other purposes.}} |- | {{|Nottingham Corporation Act 1971|local|7|17-02-1971|An Act to confer further powers on the lord mayor, aldermen and citizens of the city of Nottingham and county of the same city; to make further provision with reference to Wilford Bridge over the river Trent in the city; to make further provision for the local government and finances of the city; and for other purposes.}} |- | {{|Berkshire County Council Act 1971|local|8|17-02-1971|An Act to confer further powers on the Berkshire County Council and local authorities in the administrative county of Berkshire in relation to amenities, lands and highways and the local government, improvement, health and finances of the county; to make further provision for the superannuation of employees; and for other purposes.}} |- | {{|Bristol Corporation (General Powers) Act 1971|local|9|17-02-1971|An Act to confer further powers on the lord mayor, aldermen and burgesses of the city of Bristol, to make further provision with regard to the local government, welfare, improvement and finances of the city; and for other purposes.}} |- | {{|Mersey Docks and Harbour Board Act 1971|local|10|17-02-1971|An Act to confer further powers on the Mersey Docks and Harbour Board; and for other purposes.}} |- | {{|Buckinghamshire County Council 1971|local|11|16-03-1971|An Act to confer further powers on the County Council and on local authorities in the administrative county of Buckingham in relation to lands, and the local government, improvement, health and finances of the county and of the boroughs and districts therein; and for other purposes.}} |- | {{|Southampton Corporation Act 1971|local|12|16-03-1971|An Act to repeal certain local enactments relating to Southampton Common; to make further provision for the improvement, local government and finance of the city and county of the city of Southampton; and for other purposes.}} |- | {{|Trent and Lincolnshire Water Act 1971|local|13|30-03-1971|An Act to provide for the augmentation of the water resources of the area of the Lincolnshire River Authority; to authorise the Lincolnshire River Authority, the Trent River Authority and the North Lindsey Water Board to construct water works and to acquire lands; and for other purposes.}} |- | {{|Ipswich Dock Act 1971|local|14|30-03-1971|An Act to authorise the Ipswich Dock Commission to construct further works; and for other purposes.}} |- | {{|Teesside Corporation (General Powers) Act 1971|local|15|30-03-1971|An Act to re-enact with amendments and to extend certain local enactments in force in the county borough of Teesside; to make better provision for the health, local government and improvement of the borough; to confer further powers upon the mayor, aldermen and burgesses of that borough; and for other purposes.}} |- | {{|Cumberland River Authority Act 1971|local|16|30-03-1971|An Act to provide as a temporary measure for the augmentation of the flow of the river Derwent by abstraction from Bassenthwaite Lake; to authorise the Cumberland River Authority to construct works and acquire lands; and for other purposes.}} |- | {{|Teesside Corporation Act 1971|local|17|30-03-1971|An Act to re-enact with amendments certain local enactments in force in the county borough of Teesside relating to undertakings of the Corporation; to confer further powers upon the mayor, aldermen and burgesses of that borough; and for other purposes.}} |- | {{|British Waterways Act 1971|local|18|30-03-1971|maintained=y|An Act to make provision for regulating the use of pleasure boats and houseboats on certain of the inland waterways of the British Waterways Board and for making charges therefor; to confer further powers on the Board; and for other purposes.}} |- | {{|Essex County Council Act 1971|local|19|30-03-1971|An Act to confer further powers on the Essex County Council and local authorities in the county of Essex in relation to highways and the local government, improvement, health and finances of the county; to make further provision for the superannuation of employees; to authorise the Basildon Urban District Council to acquire lands; and for other purposes.}} |- | {{|British Aluminium (Saltburn Pier) Order Confirmation Act 1971|local|20|08-04-1971|An Act to confirm a Provisional Order under the Private Legislation Procedure (Scotland) Act 1936, relating to British Aluminium (Saltburn Pier).|po1=British Aluminium (Saltburn Pier) Order 1971|Provisional Order to confer powers on The British Aluminium Company, Limited with respect to their pier at Saltburn; and for purposes connected therewith.}} |- | {{|Plymouth Corporation Act 1971|local|21|12-05-1971|An Act to confer powers upon the lord mayor, aldermen and citizens of the city of Plymouth with regard to finance; and for other purposes.}} |- | {{|Co-operative Bank Act 1971|local|22|12-05-1971|An Act to provide for the transfer to Co-operative Bank Limited of the banking business of Co-operative Wholesale Society Limited; and for other purposes incidental thereto and consequential thereon.}} |- | {{|National Westminster Bank (North Central Finance & Lombard Banking) Act 1971|local|23|12-05-1971|An Act to provide for the transfer to Lombard Banking Limited of the undertakings of Consumer Credit Corporation, Limited, Lombank Limited, Lombank Leasing Limited, North Central Finance Limited, North Central Finance (London) Limited, North Central Finance (Southern Counties) Limited, North Central Finance (Stanton) Limited, North Central Acceptances Limited, North Central Acceptances (London) Limited, North Central Acceptances (Southern Counties) Limited and North Central Acceptances (Stanton) Limited; and for other purposes incidental thereto and consequential thereon.}} |- | {{|Australian, Mercantile, Land and Finance Company, Limited Act 1971|local|24|12-05-1971|An Act to make provision for the transfer to the State of New South Wales in the Commonwealth of Australia of the registered office of Australian, Mercantile, Land and Finance Company, Limited; for the cesser of application to that company of provisions of the Companies Acts, 1948 to 1967; and for other purposes incidental thereto.}} |- | {{|John Hollis Trust for Employees (Amendment) Act 1971|local|25|12-05-1971|An Act to vary the trusts of a settlement created by John Hollis for the benefit of employees of Hollis Bros. & E.S.A. Limited; to modify certain of the provisions of the settlement; to confer powers on the trustees of that settlement; and for other purposes.}} |- | {{|New Broken Hill Consolidated Limited Act 1971|local|26|12-05-1971|An Act to make provision for the transfer to the Commonwealth of Australia of the registered office of New Broken Hill Consolidated Limited; for the cesser of application to that company of provisions of the Companies Acts 1948 to 1967; and for other purposes incidental thereto.}} |- | {{|Dunbarton County Council Order Confirmation Act 1971|local|27|27-05-1971|An Act to confirm a Provisional Order under the Private Legislation Procedure (Scotland) Act 1936, relating to Dunbarton County Council.|po1=Dunbarton County Council Order 1971|Provisional Order to confer further powers on the county council of the county of Dunbarton in relation to the finances of the said county; to make further provision for the investment of moneys forming part of the superannuation fund maintained by the said county council; and for other purposes.}} |- | {{|Greater London Council (General Powers) Act 1971|local|28|27-05-1971|An Act to confer further powers upon the Greater London Council and other authorities; and for other purposes.}} |- | {{|Oldham Corporation Act 1971|local|29|01-07-1971|An Act to confer further powers on the mayor, aldermen and burgesses of the county borough of Oldham in relation to the finances of the county borough; and for other purposes.}} |- | {{|Southampton Corporation (Southampton Common) Act 1971|local|30|01-07-1971|An Act to confer powers on the mayor, aldermen and citizens of the city and county of the city of Southampton with regard to Southampton Common; and for other purposes.}} |- | {{|Greater Southern Cemetery and Crematorium Company Act 1971|local|31|01-07-1971|An Act to authorise the Great Southern Cemetery and Crematorium Company, Limited to sell certain lands belonging to the said Company free from restrictions; to authorise the erection of buildings thereon; and for other purposes.}} |- | {{|Lancashire County Council (General Powers) Act 1971|local|32|01-07-1971|An Act to make further provision as to the chairmen and deputy chairmen of courts of quarter sessions holden for the county palatine of Lancaster; to confer further powers on the county council of the administrative county of the county palatine of Lancaster and on local authorities in relation to the local government, improvement, health and finances of the said county; and for other purposes.}} |- | {{|Torbay Corporation Act 1971|local|33|14-07-1971|An Act to re-enact with amendments and to extend certain local enactments in force in the county borough of Torbay; to make better provision for the health, local government, improvement and finances of that borough; to confer further powers upon the mayor, aldermen and burgesses of that borough; and for other purposes.}} |- | {{|Mersey Docks and Harbour Board (Ore Berth) Act 1971|local|34|14-07-1971|An Act to authorise the Mersey Docks and Harbour Board to construct further works; and for other purposes.}} |- | {{|Luton Corporation Act 1971|local|35|14-07-1971|An Act to enable the mayor, aldermen and burgesses of the county borough of Luton to make grants towards the cost of insulating houses against noise attributable to the use of Luton Airport; to confer further powers upon the Corporation; and for other purposes.}} |- | {{|Surrey County Council Act 1971|local|36|14-07-1971|An Act to confer further powers on the Surrey County Council and on local authorities in the administrative county of Surrey in relation to lands, amenities and highways and the local government, improvement and finances of the county; and for other purposes.}} |- | {{|Edinburgh Corporation Order Confirmation Act 1971|local|37|27-07-1971|An Act to confirm a Provisional Order under the Private Legislation Procedure (Scotland) Act 1936, relating to Edinburgh Corporation.|po1=Edinburgh Corporation Order 1971|Provisional Order to authorise the Corporation of the city of Edinburgh to acquire lands; to construct new sewers within the city and to provide sewage treatment works; to enact provisions with regard to the disposal of sewage effluent; to confer further powers on the Corporation in relation to the finances of the Corporation; to borrow money for the purposes of the Order; and for other purposes.}} |- | {{|Lanarkshire County Council Order Confirmation Act 1971|local|38|27-07-1971|An Act to confirm a Provisional Order under the Private Legislation Procedure (Scotland) Act 1936, relating to Lanarkshire County Council.|po1=Lanarkshire County Council Order 1971|Provisional Order to confer on the Lanarkshire County Council further powers with respect to the local government and finances of the county; to make further provision for the investment of the superannuation fund maintained by the County Council; and for other purposes.}} |- | {{|Lerwick Harbour Order Confirmation Act 1971|local|39|27-07-1971|An Act to confirm a Provisional Order under the Private Legislation Procedure (Scotland) Act 1936, relating to Lerwick Harbour.|po1=Lerwick Harbour Order 1971|Provisional Order to authorise the Trustees of the Port and Harbour of Lerwick to carry out works for the improvement of the harbour and to borrow money; and for other purposes.}} |- | {{|London Transport Act 1971|local|40|27-07-1971|An Act to empower the London Transport Executive to construct works and to acquire lands; to extend the time for the compulsory purchase of certain lands; to confer further powers on the Executive and London Country Bus Services Limited; and for other purposes.}} |- | {{|Kesteven County Council Act 1971|local|41|27-07-1971|An Act to confer further powers on the county council of Lincoln, Parts of Kesteven, in relation to the finances of the county; to confer further powers on the county council and on local authorities and other public authorities with regard to the superannuation of and payment of compensation to or on behalf of employees and to the investment of superannuation funds; and for other purposes.}} |- | {{|Bradford Corporation Act 1971|local|42|27-07-1971|An Act to provide for the making of agreements between the lord mayor, aldermen and citizens of the city of Bradford and the Yorkshire Ouse and Hull River Authority with respect to the construction and use of certain waterworks and the discharge of water therefrom; to confer further powers upon the Corporation in respect of their water undertaking; to alter the name of the said Authority; and for other purposes.}} |- | {{|Bristol Corporation Act 1971|local|43|27-07-1971|An Act to authorise the lord mayor, aldermen and burgesses of the city of Bristol to construct works and acquire lands; to authorise the abandonment of part of the City Docks of the Corporation; to confer further powers on the Corporation; and for other purposes.}} |- | {{|Teesside Corporation (General Powers) (No. 2) Act 1971|local|44|27-07-1971|An Act to re-enact with amendments and to extend certain local enactments in force in the county borough of Teesside; to confer further powers on the mayor, aldermen and burgesses of that borough with regard to the local government, improvement and finances; and for other purposes.}} |- | {{|British Railways Act 1971|local|45|27-07-1971|An Act to empower the British Railways Board to construct works and to acquire lands; to extend the time for the compulsory purchase of certain lands; to confer further powers on the Board; and for other purposes.}} |- | {{|Hertfordshire County Council Act 1971|local|46|27-07-1971|An Act to confer further powers on the Hertfordshire County Council and local and other authorities in the administrative county of Hertford in relation to lands and the local government, improvement and finances of the county; to make further provision for the superannuation of employees and as to the holding of courts of quarter sessions for the county; and for other purposes.}} |- | {{|Humber Bridge Act 1971|local|47|27-07-1971|An Act to amend the Humber Bridge Act 1959; to confer further powers on the Humber Bridge Board; and for other purposes.}} |- | {{|Greater London Council (Money) Act 1971|local|48|27-07-1971|An Act to regulate the expenditure on capital account and on lending to other persons by the Greater London Council during the financial period from 1st April 1971 to 30th September 1972; and for other purposes.}} |- | {{|D. & J. Fowler, Limited and Associated Company Act 1971|local|49|27-07-1971|An Act to make provision for the transfer to the State of South Australia in the Commonwealth of Australia of the registered offices of D. & J. Fowler, Limited and D. & J. Fowler (Australia) Limited; for the cesser of application to those companies of provisions of the Companies Acts, 1948 to 1967; and for other purposes incidental thereto.}} |- | {{|Stockport Corporation Act 1971|local|50|27-07-1971|An Act to confer further powers on the mayor, aldermen and burgesses of the county borough of Stockport; to make further provision with regard to the local government and the health, welfare, improvement and finances of the borough; and for other purposes.}} |- | {{|Haringey Corporation Act 1971|local|51|27-07-1971|An Act to make further provision for the local government, health and improvement of the London borough of Haringey; and for other purposes.}} |- | {{|East Sussex County Council (Newhaven Bridge) Act 1971|local|52|27-07-1971|An Act to empower the county council of the administrative county of East Sussex to construct a bridge across the river Ouse with approach roads and other works and to purchase lands compulsorily for those and other purposes, to provide for the removal of an existing bridge across the river Ouse; and for other purposes.}} |- | {{|Eton Rural District Council Act 1971|local|53|27-07-1971|An Act to transfer to the Eton Rural District Council certain property and moneys of Memorial Gardens Limited, Stoke Poges Gardens Association Limited, Mobbs Memorial Trust Limited and Farnham Park Recreational Trust; to confer powers upon that council in relation to the Stoke Poges Gardens and other lands at Stoke Poges and at Farnham Royal; and for other purposes.}} |- | {{|Cornwall County Council Act 1971|local|54|27-07-1971|An Act to confer further powers on the Cornwall County Council and on local authorities in the administrative county of Cornwall in relation to lands, development and the local government, improvement and finances of and in the county; and for other purposes.}} |- | {{|Bristol Corporation (West Dock) Act 1971|local|55|27-07-1971|An Act to empower the lord mayor, aldermen and burgesses of the city of Bristol to construct works and to acquire lands; to confer further powers upon the Corporation with reference to their dock undertaking; and for other purposes.}} |- | {{|East Suffolk County Council Act 1971|local|56|27-07-1971|An Act to confer power on the East Suffolk County Council to lend money to local and other authorities; to confer further powers on local authorities in the county of East Suffolk in relation to the investment of superannuation funds maintained under the Local Government Superannuation Act 1937; to make further provision for the superannuation of employees; and for other purposes.}} |- | {{|Mersey Docks and Harbour Act 1971|local|57|27-07-1971|An Act to reconstitute the Mersey Docks and Harbour Board as a company and to alter its name; to reorganise the capital of the Board; and for other purposes.}} |- | {{|Trent River Authority (General Powers) Act 1971|local|58|27-07-1971|An Act to confer further powers on the Trent River Authority in relation to the acquisition of lands, the construction of works and the administration of the area of the authority; to make further provision for the welfare and superannuation of their staff; and for other purposes.}} |- | {{|British Transport Docks Act 1971|local|59|05-08-1971|An Act to empower the British Transport Docks Board to construct works and to acquire lands; to confer further powers on the Board; and for other purposes.}} |- | {{|Torbay Corporation (No. 2) Act 1971|local|60|05-08-1971|An Act to confer further powers on the mayor, aldermen and burgesses of the county borough of Torbay; to make further provision with regard to the health, local government, improvement and finances of that borough; and for other purposes.}} |- | {{|City of London (Various Powers) Act 1971|local|61|05-08-1971|An Act to make further provision with respect to public health and the prevention of air pollution in the city of London; the port health jurisdiction of the Corporation of London; the regulation of Epping Forest; Tower Bridge, London; the City of London Markets; and for other purposes.}} |- | {{|London Transport (No. 2) Act 1971|local|62|05-08-1971|An Act to empower the London Transport Executive to construct works and to acquire lands; to extend the time for the compulsory purchase of certain lands; to confer further powers on the Executive; and for other purposes.}} |- | {{|Oxfordshire County Council Act 1971|local|63|05-08-1971|An Act to confer further powers on the Oxfordshire County Council and on local, highway and other authorities in the administrative county of Oxford in relation to lands, amenities, highways and the local government, improvement, health and finances of the county and of the boroughs and districts therein; and for other purposes.}} |- | {{|Bournemouth Corporation Act 1971|local|64|05-08-1971|An Act to confer further powers upon the mayor, aldermen and burgesses of the borough of Bournemouth in relation to lands and the health, local government, improvement and finances of the borough; and for other purposes.}} |- | {{|Exeter Corporation Act 1971|local|65|05-08-1971|An Act to empower the mayor, aldermen and citizens of the city of Exeter to discontinue and abandon the ferry in the city across the river Exe commonly known as the Quay Ferry; to make further provision with regard to the improvement, health, local government and finances of the city; and for other purposes.}} |- | {{|Flintshire County Council Act 1971|local|66|05-08-1971|An Act to confer further powers on the Flintshire County Council and on the local, highway and other authorities in the administrative county of Flint in relation to land and highways, planning and amenities and the local government, improvement, health, welfare and finances of the county; to enact provisions with respect to the supply of heat; to make provision for the superannuation of employees; to authorise the Rhyl Urban District Council to abandon and remove the Rhyl promenade pier; and for other purposes.}} |- | {{|Manchester Corporation (General Powers) Act 1971|local|67|05-08-1971|An Act to authorise the lord mayor, aldermen and citizens of the city of Manchester to make grants towards the cost of insulating dwellings against noise and vibration attributable to aircraft; to enact provisions in relation to health, local government, lands, markets, industry, finance and pensions and to confer further powers upon the said lord mayor, aldermen and citizens; and for other purposes.}} |- | {{|Scunthorpe Corporation Act 1971|local|68|05-08-1971|An Act to confer further powers on the mayor, aldermen and burgesses of the borough of Scunthorpe; to make further provision with regard to the health, local government, improvement and finances of that borough; and for other purposes.}} |- | {{|Aldridge-Brownhills Urban District Council Act 1971|local|69|05-08-1971|An Act to re-enact with amendments and to extend certain local enactments in force in the urban district of Aldridge-Brownhills; to make further provision for the health, local government, improvement and finances of that district; to confer further powers upon the council of that district; and for other purposes.}} |- | {{|Chichester Harbour Conservancy Act 1971|local|70|05-08-1971|An Act to incorporate the Chichester Harbour Conservancy; to transfer to that Conservancy the harbour undertakings of the mayor, aldermen and citizens of the city of Chichester and the urban district council of Havant and Waterloo; to confer powers on that Conservancy; to enact provisions in connection with the matters aforesaid; and for other purposes.}} |- | {{|Isle of Wight County Council Act 1971|local|71|05-08-1971|An Act to confer further powers on the Isle of Wight County Council and on the local, highway and other authorities in the administrative county of the Isle of Wight in relation to public order and public safety; lands, planning and industry; highways and streets and the local government, improvement, health and finances of that county; and for other purposes.}} }}
