= List of acts of the 4th session of the 48th Parliament of the United Kingdom =

This is a list of acts of the 4th session of the 48th Parliament of the United Kingdom, which ran from 3 November 1982 until 13 May 1983.

Acts passed since 1963 are cited by calendar year, as opposed to the convention used for earlier acts of citing the regnal year(s) in which the relevant parliamentary session was held. Each act passed in a respective year is given a chapter number (abbreviated "c."), denoted by Arabic numerals in the case of public general acts, lowercase Roman numerals in the case of local acts, or italicised Arabic numerals in the case of personal acts. These run as separate series.

61 acts of Parliament were passed by the 48th Parliament in its 4th session: 51 public general acts and 10 local acts.

indicates that an act is available to view at legislation.gov.uk, and indicates the location of the original act in the Parliamentary Archives.

== Public general acts ==
{{legislationuk|act |- | {{|Commonwealth Development Corporation Act 1982|public|54|22-12-1982|maintained=y|An Act to authorise the making of loans to the Commonwealth Development Corporation by the Secretary of State out of the National Loans Fund and to impose new limits on sums borrowed by, or guaranteed by, the Corporation or any of its subsidiaries.}} |- | {{|National Insurance Surcharge Act 1982|public|55|22-12-1982|maintained=y|An Act to reduce the surcharge imposed by the National Insurance Surcharge Act 1976.}} |- | {{|Electricity (Financial Provisions) (Scotland) Act 1982|public|56|22-12-1982|An Act to increase the statutory limits on the amounts outstanding in respect of borrowings by the Scottish Electricity Boards.}} |- | {{|Lands Valuation Amendment (Scotland) Act 1982|public|57|22-12-1982|maintained=y|An Act to amend the definition of the expression "machinery fixed or attached" in section 42 of the Lands Valuation (Scotland) Act 1854.}} |- | {{|Consolidated Fund Act 1983|public|1|08-02-1983|An Act to apply certain sums out of the Consolidated Fund to the service of the years ending on 31st March 1983 and 1984.}} |- | {{|Representation of the People Act 1983|public|2|08-02-1983|maintained=y|An Act to consolidate the Representation of the People Acts of 1949, 1969, 1977, 1978 and 1980, the Electoral Registers Acts of 1949 and 1953, the Elections (welsh Forms) Act 1964, Part III of the Local Government Act 1972, sections 6 to 10 of the Local Government (Scotland) Act 1973, the Representation of the People (Armed Forces) Act 1976, the Returning Officers (Scotland) Act 1977, section 3 of the Representation of the People Act 1981, section 62 of and Schedule 2 to the Mental Health (Amendment) Act 1982, and connected provisions; and to repeal as obsolete the Representation of the People Act 1979 and other enactments related to the Representation of the People Acts.}} |- | {{|Agricultural Marketing Act 1983|public|3|01-03-1983|maintained=y|An Act to establish a body corporate to be known as Food from Britain to improve the marketing of food produced or processed in the United Kingdom and of other agricultural produce of the United Kingdom; to transfer to Food from Britain the functions of the Central Council for Agricultural and Horticultural Co-operation and to dissolve the Central Council; to enable certain other marketing organisations to make contributions to Food from Britain; and to repeal section 61(9) of the Agriculture Act 1967.}} |- | {{|Pig Industry Levy Act 1983|public|4|01-03-1983|maintained=y|An Act to authorise the Meat and Livestock Commission to impose a levy for the purpose of meeting costs incurred by the Minister of Agriculture, Fisheries and Food in consequence of exercising any of his powers under the Animal Health Act 1981 in relation to the disease of pigs known as Aujeszky's disease or in relation to pigs which are affected or suspected of being affected with, or have been exposed to the infection of, that disease and for the purpose of making certain additional compensation payments to the owners of such pigs in respect of losses incurred by them in consequence of action taken by the Minister in relation to those pigs under that Act; and to provide for the application of the proceeds of the levy for those and connected purposes and otherwise for the benefit of the pig industry or the pig products industry.}} |- | {{|Consolidated Fund (No. 2) Act 1983|public|5|28-03-1983|An Act to apply certain sums out of the Consolidated Fund to the service of the years ending on 31st March 1982 and 1983.}} |- | {{|British Nationality (Falkland Islands) Act 1983|public|6|28-03-1983|maintained=y|An Act to provide for the acquisition of British citizenship by persons having connections with the Falkland Islands.}} |- | {{|Conwy Tunnel (Supplementary Powers) Act 1983|public|7|28-03-1983|maintained=y|An Act to authorise the Secretary of State to acquire certain land and construct and carry out certain works, and to confer on him certain other powers, for or in connection with the construction, maintenance and improvement of a tunnel which he is authorised under the Highways Act 1980 to construct across the Conwy Estuary as part of a special road; and for connected purposes.}} |- | {{|British Fishing Boats Act 1983|public|8|28-03-1983|maintained=y|An Act to prohibit the fishing for and trans-shipment of sea fish by or from British fishing boats, in areas specified by order made by the Minister of Agriculture, Fisheries and Food and the Secretaries of State respectively concerned with the sea fishing industry in Scotland, Wales and Northern Ireland, unless those boats satisfy conditions prescribed by an order of those Ministers with respect to the nationality of members of the crew; and to prohibit the landing of sea fish in the United Kingdom from British fishing boats that do not satisfy conditions so prescribed.}} |- | {{|Currency Act 1983|public|9|28-03-1983|maintained=y|An Act to amend the Coinage Act 1971 and the law relating to issuing and writing off bank notes.}} |- | {{|Transport Act 1983|link=Transport Act 1983 (UK)|public|10|28-03-1983|maintained=y|An Act to make further provision with respect to the finances and management of certain Transport Executives; and to reduce the indebtedness of the National Dock Labour Board in respect of money borrowed from the Secretary of State for financing severance payments to registered dock workers.}} |- | {{|Civil Aviation (Eurocontrol) Act 1983|public|11|11-04-1983|maintained=y|An Act to make further provision with respect to the European Organisation for the Safety of Air Navigation known as Eurocontrol and to amend section 73(4) of the Civil Aviation Act 1982.}} |- | {{|Divorce Jurisdiction, Court Fees and Legal Aid (Scotland) Act 1983|public|12|11-04-1983|maintained=y|An Act to extend the jurisdiction of sheriffs in Scotland in relation to actions for divorce; to make provision as regards the sufficiency of evidence in certain actions for divorce in Scotland; to make new provision in Scotland as to the fees and outlays of counsel and solicitors in relation both to legal aid, and to the giving of legal advice and assistance under the Legal Advice and Assistance Act 1972; to make new provision in relation to the regulation of fees payable in the Scottish courts; and for connected purposes.}} |- | {{|Merchant Shipping Act 1983|public|13|11-04-1983|maintained=y|An Act to make further provision in respect of the registration of small ships and the appointment of registrars at ports.}} |- | {{|International Transport Conventions Act 1983|public|14|11-04-1983|maintained=y|An Act to give effect to the Convention concerning International Carriage by Rail signed on behalf of the United Kingdom on 9th May 1980; and to make further provision for the amendment of Acts giving effect to other international transport conventions so as to take account of revisions of the conventions to which they give effect.}} |- | {{|British Shipbuilders Act 1983|public|15|09-05-1983|maintained=y|An Act to make further provision with respect to the functions and activities of British Shipbuilders.}} |- | {{|Level Crossings Act 1983|public|16|09-05-1983|maintained=y|An Act to make further provision about level crossings.}} |- | {{|Plant Varieties Act 1983|public|17|09-05-1983|maintained=y|An Act to amend the Plant Varieties and Seeds Act 1964.}} |- | {{|Nuclear Material (Offences) Act 1983|public|18|09-05-1983|maintained=y|An Act to implement the Convention on the Physical Protection of Nuclear Material; and for purposes connected therewith.}} |- | {{|Matrimonial Homes Act 1983|public|19|09-05-1983|maintained=y|An Act to consolidate certain enactments relating to the rights of a husband or wife to occupy a dwelling house that has been a matrimonial home.}} |- | {{|Mental Health Act 1983|public|20|09-05-1983|maintained=y|An Act to consolidate the law relating to mentally disordered persons.}} |- | {{|Pilotage Act 1983|public|21|09-05-1983|maintained=y|An Act to consolidate the Pilotage Acts 1913 and 1936 and certain provisions of the Merchant Shipping Act 1979.}} |- | {{|Ports (Reduction of Debt) Act 1983|public|22|09-05-1983|maintained=y|An Act to make provision for reducing the indebtedness of the Port of London Authority and the Mersey Docks and Harbour Company.}} |- | {{|Water Act 1983|public|23|09-05-1983|maintained=y|An Act to make provision as to the constitution and procedure of water authorities and their borrowing and other powers and as to arrangements for the carrying out of their sewerage functions; to enable water authorities and statutory water companies to provide advice and assistance outside the United Kingdom; to provide for the dissolution of the National Water Council and the Water Space Amenity Commission; and to repeal the Water Charges Equalisation Act 1977; and for connected purposes.}} |- | {{|Licensing (Occasional Permissions) Act 1983|public|24|09-05-1983|maintained=y|An Act to empower licensing justices in England and Wales to grant to representatives of organisations not carried on for private gain occasional permissions authorising the sale of intoxicating liquor at functions connected with the activities of such organisations.}} |- | {{|Energy Act 1983|public|25|09-05-1983|maintained=y|An Act to amend the law relating to electricity so as to facilitate the generation and supply of electricity by persons other than Electricity Boards, and for certain other purposes; and to amend the law relating to the duties of persons responsible for nuclear installations and to compensation for breach of those duties.}} |- | {{|Pet Animals Act 1951 (Amendment) Act 1983|note1= (Note: Although passed 1983, and despite the heading to the Queen's Printer edition stating that the Act is the Pet Animals Act 1951 (Amendment) Act 1983 (which is how the Act is invariably cited), the section granting the short title in the Act itself deems that the Act is the "Pet Animals Act 1951 (Amendment) Act 1982".)|public|26|09-05-1983|maintained=y|An Act to amend the Pet Animals Act 1951 regulating the sale of pet animals.}} |- | {{|Appropriation Act 1983|public|27|13-05-1983|An Act to apply a sum out of the Consolidated Fund to the service of the year ending on 31st March 1984, to appropriate the supplies granted in this Session of Parliament, and to repeal certain Consolidated Fund and Appropriation Acts.}} |- | {{|Finance Act 1983|public|28|13-05-1983|maintained=y|An Act to grant certain duties, to alter other duties, and to amend the law relating to the National Debt and the Public Revenue, and to make further provision in connection with Finance.}} |- | {{|Miscellaneous Financial Provisions Act 1983|public|29|13-05-1983|maintained=y|An Act to establish a Development Commission in place of the Commissioners appointed under the Development and Road Improvement Funds Act 1909; to authorise the making of grants by the Secretary of State to bodies promoting industrial or commercial development in areas in England; to extinguish liability in respect of certain guarantees given under the Colonial Loans Act 1949; to amend certain enactments authorising the Treasury to give guarantees; to extend the power of the Crown Estate Commissioners to grant leases; to make provision for the redemption of certain annuities and allowances which have been payable out of public funds since before 1874; to amend section 173A of the Local Government Act 1972; and for connected purposes.}} |- | {{|Diseases of Fish Act 1983|public|30|13-05-1983|maintained=y|An Act to make further provision for preventing the spread of disease among fish, including shellfish and fish bred or reared in the course of fish farming.}} |- | {{|Coroners' Juries Act 1983|public|31|13-05-1983|An Act to make fresh provision with respect to the qualifications of persons eligible to serve on coroners' juries; to provide criminal penalties for evasion of service on a coroner's jury; to amend section 26 of the Coroners (Amendment) Act 1926; and for connected purposes.}} |- | {{|Marriage Act 1983|public|32|13-05-1983|maintained=y|An Act to enable marriages of house-bound and detained persons to be solemnized at the place where they reside; and for connected purposes.}} |- | {{|Solvent Abuse (Scotland) Act 1983|public|33|13-05-1983|maintained=y|An Act to amend the Social Work (Scotland) Act 1968 to add solvent abuse to the conditions indicating the need for compulsory measures of care.}} |- | {{|Mobile Homes Act 1983|public|34|13-05-1983|maintained=y|An Act to make new provision in place of sections 1 to 6 of the Mobile Homes Act 1975.}} |- | {{|Litter Act 1983|public|35|13-05-1983|maintained=y|An Act to consolidate the Litter Acts 1958 and 1971, together with section 51 of the Public Health Act 1961, section 4 of the Local Government (Development and Finance) (Scotland) Act 1964 and section 24 of the Control of Pollution Act 1974 and related provisions of those Acts.}} |- | {{|Social Security and Housing Benefits Act 1983|public|36|13-05-1983|An Act to make provision for the calculation on an historic basis of certain increases in the sums specified in sections 125 and 126A of the Social Security Act 1975 and in the needs allowances under section 29 of the Social Security and Housing Benefits Act 1982.}} |- | {{|Importation of Milk Act 1983|public|37|13-05-1983|maintained=y|An Act to make provision as to the importation of milk and as to imported milk and milk brought to Northern Ireland from Great Britain.}} |- | {{|Dentists Act 1983|public|38|13-05-1983|An Act to amend the Dentists Act 1957 and for connected purposes.}} |- | {{|Mental Health (Amendment) (Scotland) Act 1983|public|39|13-05-1983|An Act to amend the Mental Health (Scotland) Act 1960; and for connected purposes.}} |- | {{|Education (Fees and Awards) Act 1983|public|40|13-05-1983|maintained=y|An Act to make provision with respect to the fees charged by universities and other institutions to students not having the requisite connection with the United Kingdom, the Channel Islands or the Isle of Man and the exclusion of such students from eligibility for certain discretionary awards.}} |- | {{|Health and Social Services and Social Security Adjudications Act 1983|public|41|13-05-1983|maintained=y|An Act to amend the law relating to the financing of certain social services in England and Wales and Scotland and to children and young persons; to make fresh provision for the Central Council for Education and Training in Social Work and further provision for the remuneration and conditions of service of medical and dental practitioners in the National Health Service and health service officers; to amend the law relating to homes regulated by the Nursing Homes Act 1975, the Child Care Act 1980, the Residential Homes Act 1980 and the Children's Homes Act 1982; to repeal enactments about the designation of health authorities as teaching authorities and membership of authorities so designated; to make further provision for social security adjudication; to make further provision for fees for medical practitioners' certificates relating to notifiable diseases and food poisoning; to abolish certain advisory bodies; to make minor alterations in certain enactments relating to health; and for connected purposes.}} |- | {{|Copyright (Amendment) Act 1983|public|42|13-05-1983|An Act to amend section 21 of the Copyright Act 1956 so as to provide new penalties for offences relating to infringing copies of sound recordings and cinematograph films; and to provide for the issue and execution of search warrants in relation to such offences.}} |- | {{|Road Traffic (Driving Licences) Act 1983|public|43|13-05-1983|maintained=y|An Act to make provision about the granting, without tests of competence to drive, of driving licences to certain persons who are resident in Great Britain and are or have been authorised to drive under the law in force in places outside Great Britain, and for connected purposes.}} |- | {{|National Audit Act 1983|public|44|13-05-1983|maintained=y|An Act to strengthen Parliamentary control and supervision of expenditure of public money by making new provision for the appointment and status of the Comptroller and Auditor General, establishing a Public Accounts Commission and a National Audit Office and making new provision for promoting economy, efficiency and effectiveness in the use of such money by government departments and other authorities and bodies; to amend or repeal certain provisions of the Exchequer and Audit Departments Acts 1866 and 1921; and for connected purposes.}} |- | {{|County Courts (Penalties for Contempt) Act 1983|public|45|13-05-1983|maintained=y|An Act to provide for county courts to be treated as superior courts for the purposes of section 14 of the Contempt of Court Act 1981.}} |- | {{|Agricultural Holdings (Amendment) (Scotland) Act 1983|public|46|13-05-1983|maintained=y|An Act to amend the law relating to termination of tenancies of agricultural holdings in Scotland and to variation of rent for such holdings; and for connected purposes.}} |- | {{|National Heritage Act 1983|public|47|13-05-1983|maintained=y|An Act to establish Boards of Trustees of the Victoria and Albert Museum, the Science Museum, the Armouries and the Royal Botanic Gardens, Kew, to transfer property to them and confer functions on them, to make provision in relation to government grants to, and employment by, armed forces museums, to establish a Historic Buildings and Monuments Commission for England, to confer functions on the Commission, to dissolve the Historic Buildings Council for England and the Ancient Monuments Board for England, to amend certain enactments relating to the heritage, and for connected purposes.}} }}

== Local acts ==
{{legislationuk|act |- | {{|Writers to the Signet Dependants' Annuity Fund Order Confirmation Act 1982|local|24|22-12-1982|An Act to confirm a Provisional Order under the Private Legislation Procedure (Scotland) Act 1936, relating to the Writers to the Signet Dependants' Annuity Fund.|po1=Writers to the Signet Dependants' Annuity Fund Order 1982|Provisional Order to make provision in relation to the regulation and control of the Writers to the Signet Dependants' Annuity Fund; to repeal the Writers to the Signet Widows' Fund Orders 1955 and 1965; and for other purposes.}} |- | {{|Highland Region (Banavie Level Crossing) Order Confirmation Act 1982|local|25|22-12-1982|An Act to confirm a Provisional Order under the Private Legislation Procedure (Scotland) Act 1936, relating to Highland Region (Banavie Level Crossing).|po1=Highland Region (Banavie Level Crossing) Order 1982|Provisional Order to provide for the construction and maintenance of a level crossing at Banavie in the district of Lochaber; and for purposes connected therewith.}} |- | {{|Lerwick Harbour Order Confirmation Act 1982|local|26|22-12-1982|An Act to confirm a Provisional Order under the Private Legislation Procedure (Scotland) Act 1936, relating to Lerwick Harbour.|po1=Lerwick Harbour Order 1982|Provisional Order to authorise the Trustees of the port and harbour of Lerwick to construct a new work in connection with the improvement of the harbour; to acquire lands; to provide for the Trustees to be a local lighthouse authority; to confer powers on the Trustees with respect to the control of wrecks; and for other purposes.}} |- | {{|Western Isles Islands Council (Omnibus Services) Order Confirmation Act 1982|local|27|22-12-1982|An Act to confirm a Provisional Order under the Private Legislation Procedure (Scotland) Act 1936, relating to the Western Isles Islands Council (Omnibus Services).|po1=Western Isles Islands Council (Omnibus Services) Order 1982|Provisional Order to empower the Western Isles Islands Council to operate an omnibus undertaking.}} |- | {{|Ullapool Pier (Works) Order Confirmation Act 1983|local|1|08-02-1983|An Act to confirm a Provisional Order under the Private Legislation Procedure (Scotland) Act 1936, relating to Ullapool Pier (Works).|po1=Ullapool Pier (Works) Order 1982|po1note1= (Note: Although passed in 1983, the short title specifies the year 1982.)|Provisional Order to authorise the construction of works; and for other purposes.}} |- | {{|British Waterways Act 1983|local|2|08-02-1983|maintained=y|An Act to confer further powers on the British Waterways Board; to make further provisions for the control and regulation of the Board's waterways; to make provisions in relation to certain statutory and other obligations of the Board; and for other purposes.}} |- | {{|Greater London Council (General Powers) Act 1983|local|3|28-03-1983|An Act to confer further powers upon the Greater London Council and other authorities; and for other purposes.}} |- | {{|British Railways (Liverpool Street Station) Act 1983|local|4|11-04-1983|An Act to empower the British Railways Board to construct works and to purchase lands in the city of London and in the London boroughs of Hackney and Tower Hamlets; to confer further powers on the Board and for other purposes.}} |- | {{|Hampshire Act 1983|local|5|09-05-1983|maintained=y|An Act to re-enact with amendments and to extend certain local enactments in force within the county of Hampshire; to confer further powers on the Hampshire County Council and local authorities in the county; to make further provision with regard to the environment, local government, improvement, health and finances of the county; and for other purposes.}} |- | {{|Parkeston Quay Act 1983|local|6|13-05-1983|An Act to empower Sealink Harbours Limited to construct works and to acquire land at Parkeston Quay; to confer further powers on the Company; and for other purposes.}} }}
