= List of acts of the 2nd session of the 55th Parliament of the United Kingdom =

This is a list of acts of the 2nd session of the 55th Parliament of the United Kingdom, which ran from 9 May 2012 until 25 April 2013.

Acts passed since 1963 are cited by calendar year, as opposed to the convention used for earlier acts of citing the regnal year(s) in which the relevant parliamentary session was held. Each act passed in a respective year is given a chapter number (abbreviated "c."), denoted by Arabic numerals in the case of public general acts, lowercase Roman numerals in the case of local acts, or italicised Arabic numerals in the case of personal acts. These run as separate series.

42 acts of Parliament were passed by the 55th Parliament in its 2nd session: 38 public general acts and 4 local acts.

indicates that an act is available to view at legislation.gov.uk, and indicates the location of the original act in the Parliamentary Archives.

== Public general acts ==
{{legislationuk|act |- | {{|Supply and Appropriation (Main Estimates) Act 2012|public|13|17-07-2012|maintained=y|An Act to authorise the use of resources for the year ending with 31 March 2013; to authorise both the issue of sums out of the Consolidated Fund and the application of income for that year; and to appropriate the supply authorised for that year by this Act and by the Supply and Appropriation (Anticipation and Adjustments) Act 2012.}} |- | {{|Finance Act 2012|public|14|17-07-2012|maintained=y|An Act to grant certain duties, to alter other duties, and to amend the law relating to the National Debt and the Public Revenue, and to make further provision in connection with finance.}} |- | {{|European Union (Approval of Treaty Amendment Decision) Act 2012|public|15|31-10-2012|maintained=y|repealed=y|An Act to make provision for the purposes of section 3 of the European Union Act 2011 in relation to the European Council decision of 25 March 2011 amending Article 136 of the Treaty on the Functioning of the European Union with regard to a stability mechanism for Member States whose currency is the euro.}} |- | {{|Infrastructure (Financial Assistance) Act 2012|public|16|31-10-2012|maintained=y|An Act to make provision in connection with the giving of financial assistance in respect of the provision of infrastructure.}} |- | {{|Local Government Finance Act 2012|public|17|31-10-2012|maintained=y|An Act to make provision about non-domestic rating; to make provision about grants to local authorities; to make provision about council tax; to make provision about the supply of information for purposes relating to rates in Northern Ireland; and for connected purposes.}} |- | {{|Mental Health (Approval Functions) Act 2012|public|18|31-10-2012|maintained=y|An Act to authorise things done before the day on which this Act is passed in the purported exercise of functions relating to the approval of registered medical practitioners and clinicians under the Mental Health Act 1983.}} |- | {{|Civil Aviation Act 2012|public|19|19-12-2012|maintained=y|An Act to make provision about the regulation of operators of dominant airports; to confer functions on the Civil Aviation Authority under competition legislation in relation to services provided at airports; to make provision about aviation security; to make provision about the regulation of provision of flight accommodation; to make further provision about the Civil Aviation Authority's membership, administration and functions in relation to enforcement, regulatory burdens and the provision of information relating to aviation; and for connected purposes.}} |- | {{|Prisons (Interference with Wireless Telegraphy) Act 2012|public|20|19-12-2012|maintained=y|An Act to make provision about interference with wireless telegraphy in prisons and similar institutions.}} |- | {{|Financial Services Act 2012|public|21|19-12-2012|maintained=y|An Act to amend the Bank of England Act 1998, the Financial Services and Markets Act 2000 and the Banking Act 2009; to make other provision about financial services and markets; to make provision about the exercise of certain statutory functions relating to building societies, friendly societies and other mutual societies; to amend section 785 of the Companies Act 2006; to make provision enabling the Director of Savings to provide services to other public bodies; and for connected purposes.}} |- | {{|Police (Complaints and Conduct) Act 2012|public|22|19-12-2012|maintained=y|An Act to make provision about interviews held during certain investigations under Schedule 3 to the Police Reform Act 2002; and about the application of Part 2 of that Act to matters occurring before 1 April 2004.}} |- | {{|Small Charitable Donations Act 2012|public|23|19-12-2012|maintained=y|An Act to provide for the making of payments to certain charities and clubs in respect of certain gifts made to them by individuals; and for connected purposes.}} |- | {{|Trusts (Capital and Income) Act 2013|public|1|31-01-2013|maintained=y|An Act to amend the law relating to capital and income in trusts.}} |- | {{|Statute Law (Repeals) Act 2013|public|2|31-01-2013|maintained=y|An Act to promote the reform of the statute law by the repeal, in accordance with recommendations of the Law Commission and the Scottish Law Commission, of certain enactments which (except in so far as their effect is preserved) are no longer of practical utility.}} |- | {{|Prevention of Social Housing Fraud Act 2013|public|3|31-01-2013|maintained=y|An Act to create offences and make other provision relating to sub-letting and parting with possession of social housing; to make provision about the investigation of social housing fraud; and for connected purposes.}} |- | {{|Disabled Persons' Parking Badges Act 2013|public|4|31-01-2013|maintained=y|An Act to amend section 21 of the Chronically Sick and Disabled Persons Act 1970, and for connected purposes.}} |- | {{|European Union (Croatian Accession and Irish Protocol) Act 2013|public|5|31-01-2013|maintained=y|An Act to make provision consequential on the treaty concerning the accession of the Republic of Croatia to the European Union, signed at Brussels on 9 December 2011, and provision consequential on the Protocol on the concerns of the Irish people on the Treaty of Lisbon, adopted at Brussels on 16 May 2012; and to make provision about the entitlement of nationals of the Republic of Croatia to enter or reside in the United Kingdom as workers.}} |- | {{|Electoral Registration and Administration Act 2013|public|6|31-01-2013|maintained=y|An Act to make provision about the registration of electors and the administration and conduct of elections; and to amend section 3(2)(a) of the Parliamentary Constituencies Act 1986.}} |- | {{|HGV Road User Levy Act 2013|public|7|28-02-2013|maintained=y|An Act to make provision charging a levy in respect of the use or keeping of heavy goods vehicles on public roads in the United Kingdom, and for connected purposes.}} |- | {{|Mental Health (Discrimination) Act 2013|public|8|28-02-2013|maintained=y|An Act to make further provision about discrimination against people on the grounds of their mental health.}} |- | {{|European Union (Approvals) Act 2013|public|9|28-02-2013|maintained=y|repealed=y|An Act to make provision approving for the purposes of section 8 of the European Union Act 2011 certain draft decisions under Article 352 of the Treaty on the Functioning of the European Union; and to make provision approving for the purposes of section 7(3) of that Act a draft decision under Article 17(5) of the Treaty on European Union about the number of members of the European Commission.}} |- | {{|Scrap Metal Dealers Act 2013|public|10|28-02-2013|maintained=y|An Act to amend the law relating to scrap metal dealers; and for connected purposes.}} |- | {{|Prisons (Property) Act 2013|public|11|28-02-2013|maintained=y|An Act to make provision for the destruction of certain property found in prisons and similar institutions.}} |- | {{|Supply and Appropriation (Anticipation and Adjustments) Act 2013|public|12|26-03-2013|maintained=y|An Act to authorise the use of resources for the years ending with 31 March 2010, 31 March 2011, 31 March 2012, 31 March 2013 and 31 March 2014; to authorise the issue of sums out of the Consolidated Fund for the years ending with 31 March 2013 and 31 March 2014; and to appropriate the supply authorised by this Act for the years ending with 31 March 2010, 31 March 2011, 31 March 2012 and 31 March 2013.}} |- | {{|Presumption of Death Act 2013|public|13|26-03-2013|maintained=y|An Act to make provision in relation to the presumed death of missing persons; and for connected purposes.}} |- | {{|Mobile Homes Act 2013|public|14|26-03-2013|maintained=y|An Act to amend the law relating to mobile homes.}} |- | {{|Antarctic Act 2013|public|15|26-03-2013|maintained=y|An Act to make provision consequential on Annex VI to the Protocol on Environmental Protection to the Antarctic Treaty; to amend the Antarctic Act 1994; and for connected purposes.}} |- | {{|Welfare Benefits Up-rating Act 2013|public|16|26-03-2013|maintained=y|An Act to make provision relating to the up-rating of certain social security benefits and tax credits.}} |- | {{|Jobseekers (Back to Work Schemes) Act 2013|public|17|26-03-2013|maintained=y|An Act to make provision about the effect of certain provisions relating to participation in a scheme designed to assist persons to obtain employment and about notices relating to participation in such a scheme.}} |- | {{|Justice and Security Act 2013|public|18|25-04-2013|maintained=y|An Act to provide for oversight of the Security Service, the Secret Intelligence Service, the Government Communications Headquarters and other activities relating to intelligence or security matters; to make provision about closed material procedure in relation to certain civil proceedings; to prevent the making of certain court orders for the disclosure of sensitive information; and for connected purposes.}} |- | {{|Groceries Code Adjudicator Act 2013|public|19|25-04-2013|maintained=y|An Act to set up a Groceries Code Adjudicator with the role of enforcing the Groceries Code and encouraging compliance with it.}} |- | {{|Succession to the Crown Act 2013|public|20|25-04-2013|maintained=y|An Act to make succession to the Crown not depend on gender; to make provision about Royal Marriages; and for connected purposes.}} |- | {{|Partnerships (Prosecution) (Scotland) Act 2013|public|21|25-04-2013|maintained=y|An Act to make provision about the prosecution in Scotland of partnerships, partners and others following dissolution or changes in membership.}} |- | {{|Crime and Courts Act 2013|public|22|25-04-2013|maintained=y|An Act to establish, and make provision about, the National Crime Agency; to abolish the Serious Organised Crime Agency and the National Policing Improvement Agency; to make provision about the judiciary and the structure, administration, proceedings and powers of courts and tribunals; to make provision about deferred prosecution agreements; to make provision about border control; to make provision about drugs and driving; and for connected purposes.}} |- | {{|Marine Navigation Act 2013|public|23|25-04-2013|maintained=y|An Act to make provision in relation to marine navigation and harbours.}} |- | {{|Enterprise and Regulatory Reform Act 2013|public|24|25-04-2013|maintained=y|An Act to make provision about the UK Green Investment Bank; to make provision about employment law; to establish and make provision about the Competition and Markets Authority and to abolish the Competition Commission and the Office of Fair Trading; to amend the Competition Act 1998 and the Enterprise Act 2002; to make provision for the reduction of legislative burdens; to make provision about copyright and rights in performances; to make provision about payments to company directors; to make provision about redress schemes relating to lettings agency work and property management work; to make provision about the supply of customer data; to make provision for the protection of essential supplies in cases of insolvency; to make provision about certain bodies established by Royal Charter; to amend section 9(5) of the Equality Act 2010; and for connected purposes.}} |- | {{|Public Service Pensions Act 2013|public|25|25-04-2013|maintained=y|An Act to make provision for public service pension schemes; and for connected purposes.}} |- | {{|Defamation Act 2013|public|26|25-04-2013|maintained=y|An Act to amend the law of defamation.}} |- | {{|Growth and Infrastructure Act 2013|public|27|25-04-2013|maintained=y|An Act to make provision in connection with facilitating or controlling the following, namely, the provision or use of infrastructure, the carrying-out of development, and the compulsory acquisition of land; to make provision about when rating lists are to be compiled; to make provision about the rights of employees of companies who agree to be employee shareholders; and for connected purposes.}} }}

== Local acts ==
{{legislationuk|act |- | {{|Canterbury City Council Act 2013|local|1|28-02-2013|maintained=y|archived=n|An Act to confer powers on Canterbury City Council for the better control of street trading in the city of Canterbury.}} |- | {{|Leeds City Council Act 2013|local|2|28-02-2013|maintained=y|archived=n|An Act to confer powers on Leeds City Council for the better control of street trading in the city of Leeds.}} |- | {{|Nottingham City Council Act 2013|local|3|28-02-2013|maintained=y|archived=n|An Act to (Note: The Queen's Printer edition erroneously begins with the words "An Act to to", but the Journals of the House of Commons confirm that the Bill of the same name which was given Royal Assent on 28 February 2013 began with the words "A Bill to". The long title of the Act must, therefore, correspond.) confer powers on Nottingham City Council for the better control of street trading in the city of Nottingham.}} |- | {{|Reading Borough Council Act 2013|local|4|28-02-2013|maintained=y|archived=n|An Act to confer powers on Reading Borough Council for the better control of street trading and touting in the borough of Reading.}} }}
