= Statue of David Livingstone =

Statue of David Livingstone may refer to:

- Statue of David Livingstone, Edinburgh, Scotland
- Statue of David Livingstone, Zimbabwe

== See also ==
- Cultural depictions of David Livingstone
