= Parliamentary Estate =

Location in England

Coordinates: 51°29′54.28″N 0°7′32.28″W

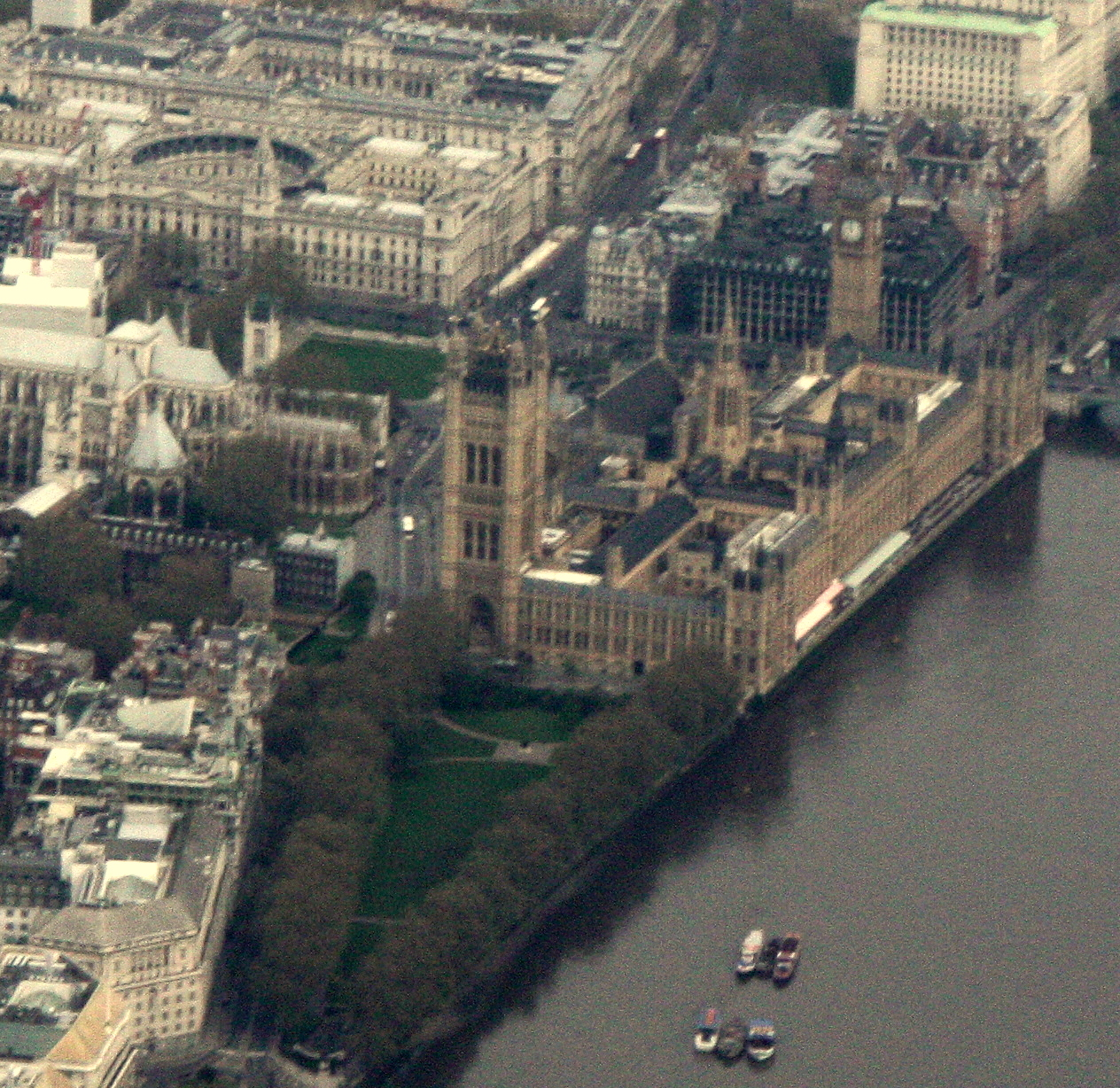
Aerial view of the area of the Parliamentary Estate

The Parliamentary Estate is the land and buildings used by the Parliament of the United Kingdom.

The most notable part of the Parliamentary Estate is the Palace of Westminster, where the chambers of both houses of Parliament (the Commons and the Lords) are located. The oldest part of the Palace of Westminster is Westminster Hall, the historic core of the building; the present-day Palace of Westminster was built after a major fire in 1834 destroyed all of the palace except for Westminster Hall, the Chapel of St Mary Undercroft, the Cloisters and Chapter House of St Stephen's, and the Jewel Tower. The palace includes two courtyards, the Old Palace Yard and New Palace Yard; the former dates to the time of Edward the Confessor, while the latter was built in 1097 on the orders of William II (Rufus).

The northern part of the Parliamentary Estate lies north of Bridge Street. It includes:

- Canon Row
- Parliament Street
- Derby Gate: formerly the Whitehall Club; houses office space for parliamentary staff and the Commons Library
- Norman Shaw North and Norman Shaw South: two 1890s buildings, both containing office space for members of Parliament (MPs) and their staff
- Portcullis House: an office building for MPs and staff, opened February 2001
- Richmond House and Richmond Terrace: became part of the Parliamentary Estate in January 2018

== See also ==
- Parliament Square
- Whitehall
