= Parliamentary Archives =

British parliament archives

Coordinates: 51.4983°N 0.1254°W

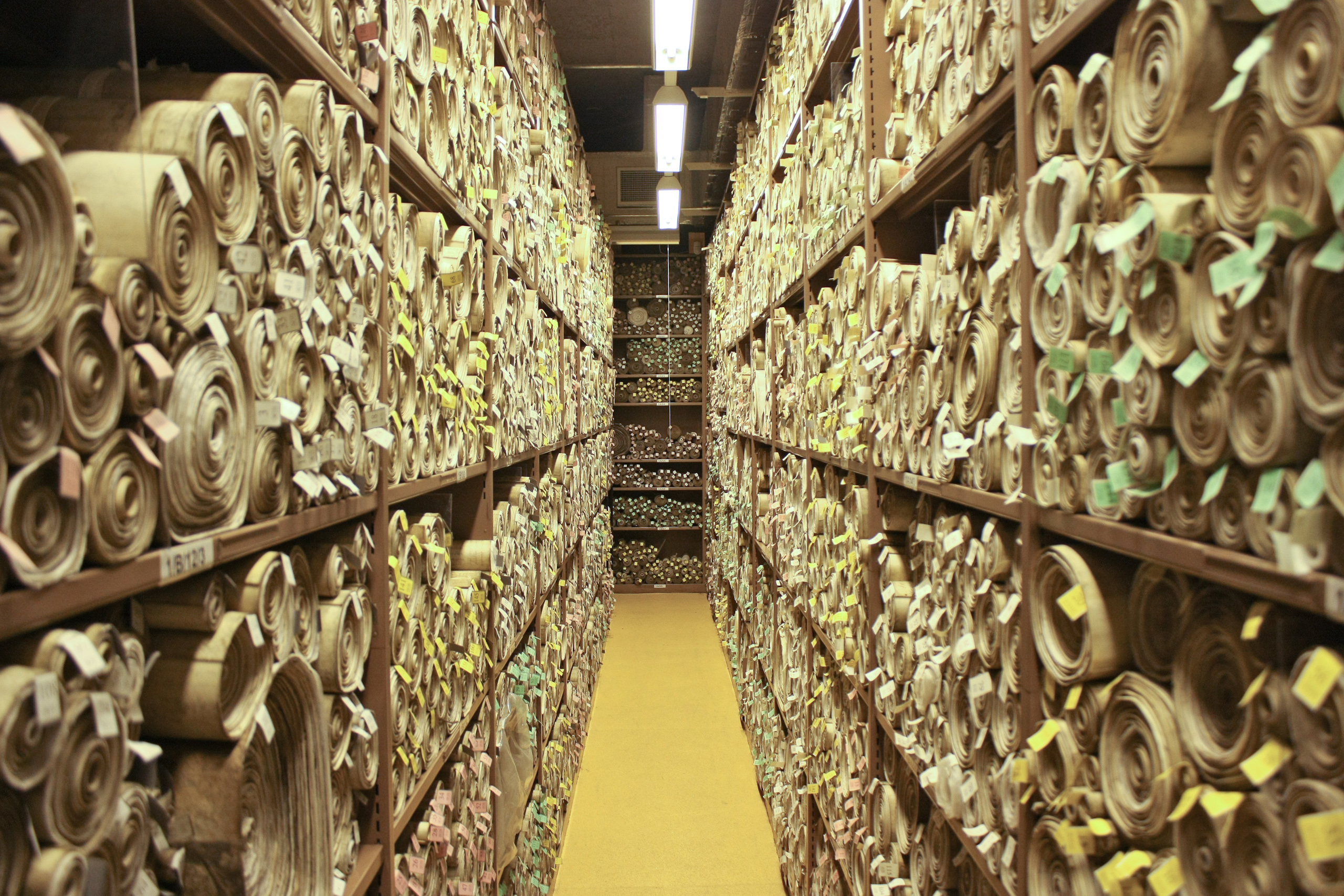
Rolls containing Acts of Parliament in the Parliamentary Archives at Victoria Tower, Palace of Westminster, in 2011

The Parliamentary Archives of the United Kingdom preserves and makes available to the public the records of the House of Lords and House of Commons back to 1497, as well as some 200 other collections of parliamentary interest. The present title was officially adopted in November 2006, as a change from the previous title, the House of Lords Record Office.

The over three million records are stored at The National Archives in Kew. Some of the most important constitutional records of the United Kingdom are in the collection, including the Petition of Right (1628), the Death Warrant of Charles I (1649), the Habeas Corpus Act 1679, the draft and final Bill of Rights (1689), the Slave Trade Act (1807 and 1833), the Great Reform Act (1832), and successive Representation of the People Acts. The archive was previously housed in the Victoria Tower at the Palace of Westminster, but was moved to its current location in 2025.

The archives also oversees records management for Parliament, has an active outreach programme and frequently appears on radio and TV programmes.

== History ==
The archive of the House of Lords originated in March 1497, when the then Clerk, Master Richard Hatton, having prepared the Parliament Roll for that session for transfer to Chancery, retained in the House of Lords the complete series of sixteen enacted Bills, or Original Acts, from which he had made the enrolment. Since then, this series has been preserved continuously among the records of the House of Lords.

By 1509, the Clerk of the Parliaments and his assistants (today known collectively as the Parliament Office) had hived off from Chancery, and in the course of the 16th century this newly independent Lords office gradually expanded and formalised its record keeping. In addition to the class of Original Acts already mentioned, the clerks preserved Journals of the House of Lords, now surviving from 1510, Petitions from 1531 and Bills from 1558. It seems, however, that the office was somewhat haphazard in its methods; Cardinal Wolsey, for instance, when Lord Chancellor, is said to have removed all the Acts and Journals relating to one session. A more business-like administration began with the advent of two Clerks in the 17th century, Robert Bowyer (1609–1621) and Henry Elsynge (1621–1635). Under these diligent and scholarly men the Lords archive took its modern form. Petitions and many other forms of Papers coming to the Lords were carefully filed; extensive series of rough Minutes and of Committee Proceedings were preserved; and, not least in importance, the records were assigned a permanent home at the south west corner of the Palace of Westminster, in a moated building (still surviving, and open to the public), the 14th-century Jewel Tower. Here the principal records of the Lords remained from 1621 to 1864, being available throughout this period for inspection by the public. The contents of some were given still wider currency in the 18th century as certain Bills and Papers began to be printed, and when, in 1767, the Lords ordered the printing of their Journals.

Meanwhile, a second parliamentary archive, the records of the House of Commons, had been forming in another part of the Palace of Westminster. Initially, in the Middle Ages, it could be said that no formal records at all were made of the domestic proceedings of the House of Commons. From 1547, however, a Commons Journal survives, and, parallel with the formation in the Lords of the main Parliamentary records under Bowyer and Elsynge, separate series of domestic records of the Commons began to accumulate, of Petitions and Papers (from the reign of Elizabeth I), of Return Books of Elections (from 1625) and of Minute Books of Committees (from 1623).

== The archives after the fire of 1834 ==
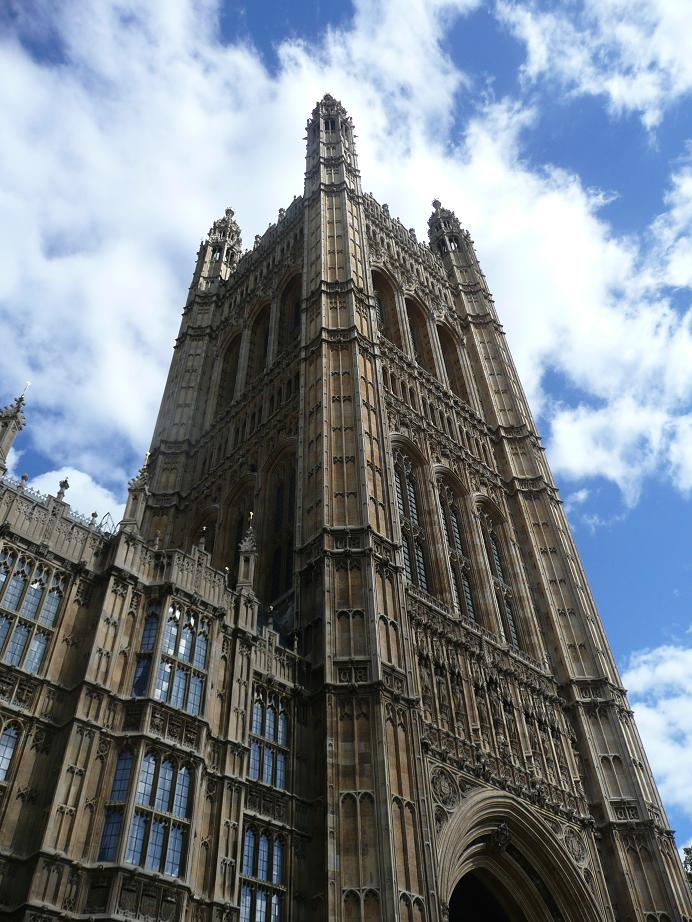
The Victoria Tower, the largest tower of the Palace of Westminster

By the early 19th century the House of Commons archive was extensive, but on the night of 16 October 1834 almost the entire stock—with the vital exception of the Commons Journals—was consumed in the "tally stick fire", which destroyed a great part of the fabric of the Palace of Westminster. The records had been stored in the House of Commons Library and various attics throughout the Commons, all of which went up in smoke.

The House of Lords archive, however, survived. This was in part due to the isolated position of the Jewel Tower, where the main series of records had been preserved, but also in part owing to the efforts of a Lords clerk, Henry Stone Smith, who threw out of the blazing windows of the main building onto Old Palace Yard many hundreds of bundles of other Lords papers that had not been transferred to the Jewel Tower. These bundles for several decades after the fire led a confused existence, being virtually forgotten by those outside the Parliament Office, until, in 1870, the newly formed Royal Commission on Historical Manuscripts began to issue regular reports. In them, the commission drew attention to the extent and variety of manuscripts preserved in the House of Lords. The first Report of the Commission brought to light a packet of letters which had been abandoned by Charles I at the Battle of Naseby, as well as the "annexed" Book of Common Prayer of 1662, the Declaration of Breda, and other public muniments which had "just been untombed from this mausoleum of historic remains" (as Thomas Duffus Hardy and his fellow Commissioners remarked). The succeeding Reports of the Commissioners were continued from 1900 onwards by calendars published by the House of Lords itself.

During the time that the records were being identified and calendared on behalf of the Historical Manuscripts Commission they were also gradually being installed in a new repository. After the fire of 1834, the House of Lords gave directions that a new building must contain two "Fireproof Repositories for Papers and Documents". Charles Barry's winning design had as its culminating feature a tower over the Royal entrance in which every storey included "Record Rooms". The height of this tower, the "Queen Victoria Tower", steadily increased from that indicated in the original plan (of some 200 feet (61 m)) until, in 1855, when the wrought-iron flagstaff was at last put into position, the tower was proudly claimed to be not merely "the grandest feature of the building", but the largest and highest square tower in the world, 323 feet (98 m) high to the base of the flagstaff and 395 feet (120 m) high to the top of the crown at its summit. Within the tower, cast-iron spiral staircases of 553 steps linked twelve floors, and on most of the floors there were eight strong rooms—accommodation at that time so ample for the parliamentary records that at one stage the tower was intended also to house the principal holdings of the Public Record Office.

During the twentieth century, two important developments occurred in the preservation of the parliamentary records. The first concerned the records of the Commons. In 1927 the Clerk of the House of Commons resolved to transfer to the Victoria Tower an extensive post-1834 series of Private Bill records, though still retaining ultimate ownership of them for the House. This precedent has been followed by succeeding Clerks of the Commons, and in 1957 the core records of the House of Commons, the series of some 241 original manuscript Journals, dating from 1547 to 1800, were deposited in the Victoria Tower, by authority of the Speaker of the House. Secondly, in 1937, the then-Clerk of the Parliaments, Sir Henry Badeley, initiated a survey of the entire Lords archive. The resulting report by V. M. R. Goodman revealed the necessity of a full-time staff (which the records did not then have) to undertake boxing, repair and production of the manuscripts. The Second World War intervened, but in 1946 Badeley set up a House of Lords Record Office, under a Clerk of the Records who was to act as the deputy of the Clerk of the Parliaments in all record matters.

== The House of Lords Record Office ==
To the Clerk of the Records was entrusted the care of the contents of the Victoria Tower, including both Lords and Commons documents and certain other small groups of records relating to the Palace of Westminster. A public Search Room was opened, and when in the 1950s the Record Office Technical Committee highlighted the need for repairing the thousands of deposited plans in the Victoria Tower, two craftsmen were recruited specifically for this task. Today the conservation unit numbers six staff, on secondment from the British Library. The publication of calendars, which had ceased in 1922, was resumed in 1949 and continued to the 1980s.

In 1975 the major acquisition of the collections of the Beaverbrook Library expanded the collection to include the papers of David Lloyd George, Bonar Law, and Max Aitken, Lord Beaverbrook.

The principal activity of the House of Lords Record Office, however, in the immediate post-war years concerned the reconstruction of the repository. The Victoria Tower, although ample in dimensions, was found in 1948 to be defective both in its structure and its equipment. In the course of the following years the interior of the Tower was therefore almost entirely rebuilt by the Ministry of Public Building and Works. The resulting repository was air conditioned and contained 5.5 miles (8.9 km) of steel shelving on twelve floors. It was declared open by the Viscount Hailsham, Leader of the House of Lords, on 3 July 1963, with the intention, as he said, that "this new building may have a long and distinguished career... in the service of Parliament, history, and culture". This lasted until the late 1990s, when it became clear that the air-conditioning in the repository was failing to comply with required standards, and other services needed updating.

== The Parliamentary Archives today ==
From 1996 to 2000, a records management survey was undertaken of most of the administrative offices of the Palace of Westminster. The survey findings were incorporated into the Parliamentary Records Management Policy Guidelines, which was approved by both houses. This was followed by a project to implement corporate records management to international standards in Parliament. In 2001, a new post of Freedom of Information Officer was created to develop and implement policies for House of Lords' compliance with the Freedom of Information Act 2000 and the Data Protection Act 1998. In 2012 this corporate function moved to the Clerk of the Parliaments' office of the House of Lords. From 2000 to 2004 the air-conditioning and other environmental controls in the Victoria Tower were refurbished to bring it up to the British Standard for archival storage, BS 5454, and from 2000 to 2005 a major project converted the paper finding aids of the collections into a single on-line catalogue, known as Portcullis.

In 1999, the House of Lords Record Office took on the subsidiary title of Parliamentary Archives in order to clarify the custodial responsibility and whereabouts of the House of Commons Archives for members of the public, and in 2006 this became its official name.

Historical collections of the House of Commons Library and Lords Library are also available in the Archives.

Today the archives employs over 30 staff, including archivists, digital archivists, records managers, digitisation and collection care specialists. The team provide information management, preservation, access and outreach services enabling anyone in the world to use Parliament's records, both now and in the future. The archives has an operational digital repository and is working to acquire and ensure the long term preservation of Parliament's digital records. New collections also include a web archive which maintains a history of the main parliamentary website and its many subsites.

In March 2021, the Parliamentary Archives became an Accredited Archive Service.

In March 2022, it was announced that the Parliamentary Archives would be relocating to The National Archives, Kew. The reasons for the move included the challenging environmental conditions of Victoria Tower and the increased need for public access to the collections. The relocation was completed in September 2025. Public access was being restored progressively and expected to be completed in June 2026.

== Directors of the Archives (Clerks of the Records) ==
The head of the archives was known as the Clerk of the Records until a change of job title in 2009 to Director of the Parliamentary Archives. Since 1946 this post has been held by:

- Francis Needham (1946)
- Maurice Bond (1946)
- H S Cobb (1981)
- David Johnson (1991)
- Stephen Ellison (1999)
- Caroline Shenton (2008)
- Adrian Brown (2014)
