= Statue of George V, Westminster =

Sculpture by William Reid Dick

George V
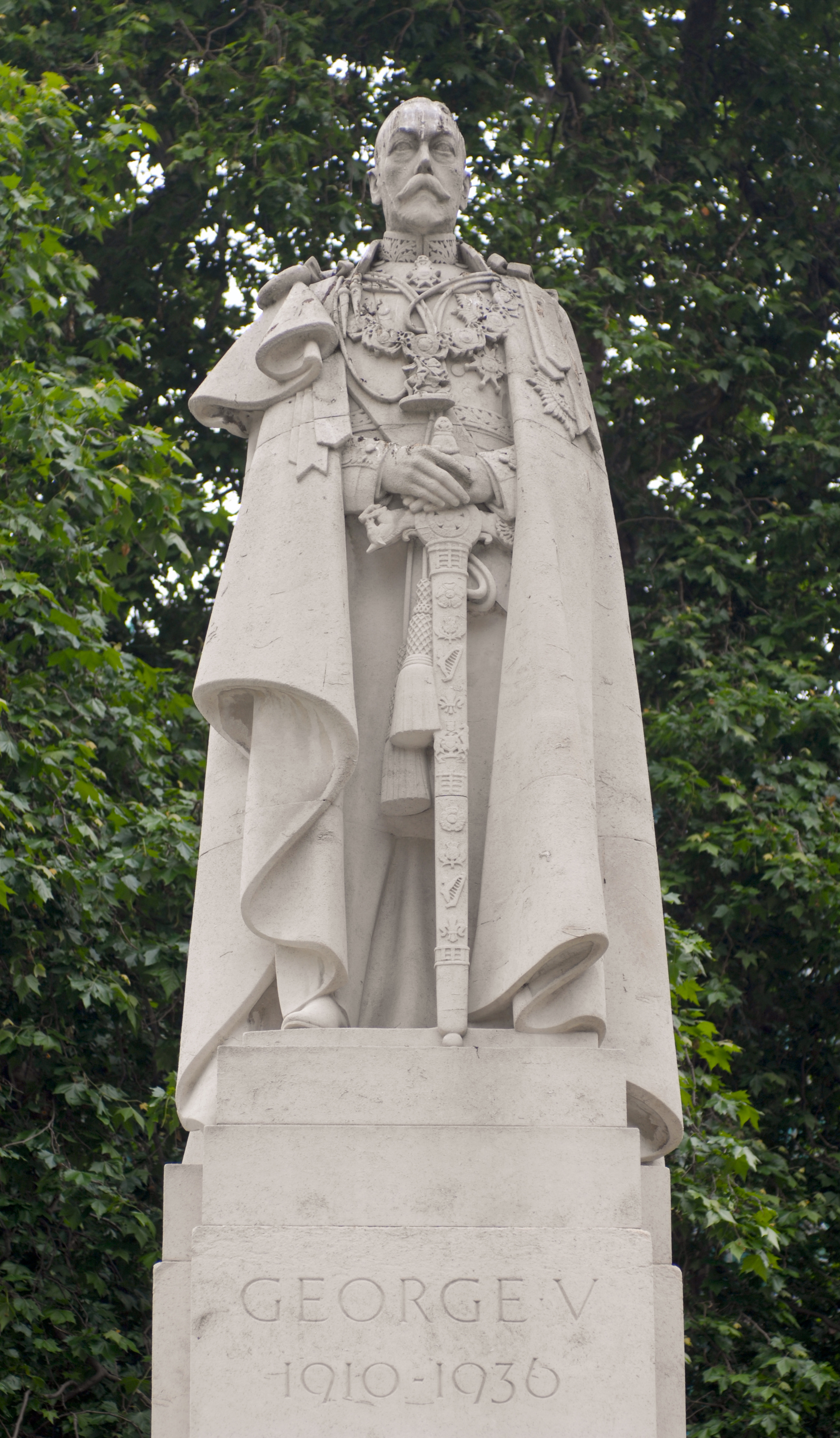
- Artist: William Reid Dick
- Year: 1947 (unveiled)
- Type: Portland stone
- Location: London, SW1 United Kingdom; 51.498972°N 0.12634°W

The statue of George V in Old Palace Yard, Westminster, London, is a sculpture of George V, King of the United Kingdom and the British Dominions, and Emperor of India. The statue was sculpted prior to the Second World War and was hidden in a quarry during the war years. Other locations were suggested for the statue, including Parliament Square, but it was unveiled opposite the House of Lords in 1947.

== Description ==
The statue stands 10 feet (3.0 m) high and is made of Portland stone. It is located south of The Lady Chapel, Westminster Abbey and opposite the House of Lords. It is a Grade II listed structure, having become so on 5 February 1970.

== History ==
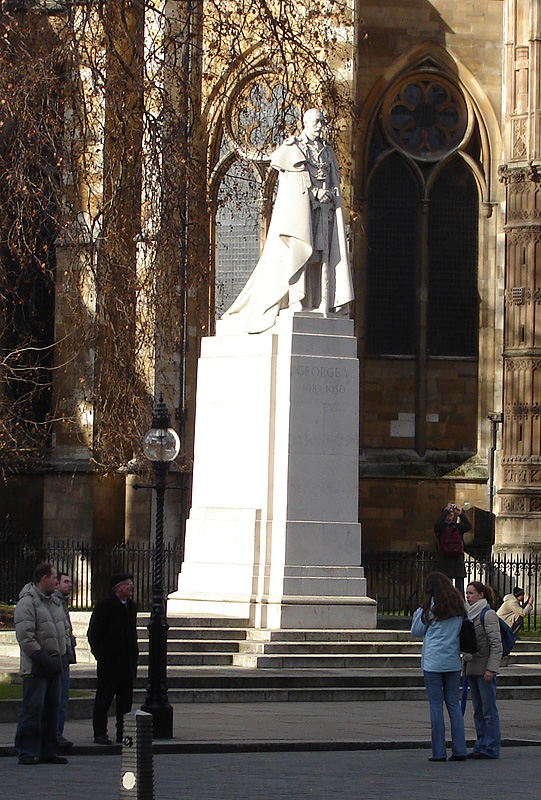
The statue on its plinth, with Westminster Abbey in the background

It was announced in March 1937 by the Lord Mayor of London that William Reid Dick had been selected as the sculptor of a statue of George V. Giles Gilbert Scott was selected to design the architecture of the plinth. A location in Abingdon Street opposite the House of Lords was announced in October 1937. The construction was organised by the King George V National Memorial Committee. The original design proved controversial and resulted in some criticism: it was to feature an ornate Gothic canopy which critics described as "dwarfing" the statue itself. Following a public consultation this feature was removed from later designs.

The Amenities groups of both the House of Commons and the House of Lords opposed the citing of the statue facing the House of Lords as they were concerned it would lead to the demolition of No. 6 and 7 Old Palace Yard and houses in a nearby street. A model of the statue was exhibited in the Member's tea room of the House of Commons.

The Royal Fine Art Commission suggested that the statue should be located in Parliament Square instead of opposite the House of Lords. The construction of the statue took place prior to the Second World War, but the danger of bringing the statue to London prevented the erection of it until after the war. The carving of the statue actually took place in the Portland quarry from which the stone was produced, and during the war years it was placed inside one of the quarry's tunnels on the Island in order to prevent it from potential damage due to German bombing raids. Following the war it was moved to the Tate Gallery while the statue's site was prepared for it. The statue was placed in the original proposed spot opposite the House of Lords, which required the demolition of No. 5 Old Palace Yard. It was unveiled by King George VI, on 22 October 1947 and was attended by Queen Elizabeth, Queen Mary, and Princesses Elizabeth and Margaret.

In 1968, the symbol of the Campaign for Nuclear Disarmament was drawn on the side of the plinth, provoking the question of its removal to be raised by Dudley Smith MP in the House of the Commons.
