= William Reid Dick =

Scottish sculptor (1878–1961)

Sir William Dick
- Portrait of William Reid Dick, 1934, by Philippe Ledoux
- Born: 13 January 1878; Glasgow, Scotland
- Died: 1 October 1961 (aged 83); Maida Vale, London, England
- Education: Glasgow School of Art; South London Technical School of Art
- Known for: Sculpture

Sir William Reid Dick, KCVO RA (13 January 1878 – 1 October 1961) was a Scottish sculptor known for his innovative stylisation of form in his monument sculptures and simplicity in his portraits. He became an Associate of the Royal Academy in 1921 and a Royal Academician in 1928. Dick served as president of the Royal Society of British Sculptors from 1933 to 1938. He was knighted by King George V in 1935. He was Sculptor in Ordinary for Scotland to King George VI from 1938 to 1952, then held the post under Queen Elizabeth until his death in 1961.

== Biography ==
=== Early life ===
Born into a working-class family in the Gorbals, Glasgow, Dick was apprenticed to a firm of stonemasons at the age of twelve and during the next five years he learned to carve stone and took evening classes at the Glasgow School of Art. In 1892, under the supervision of George Frampton, Dick worked on some of the external carvings for the Kelvingrove Art Gallery and completed his apprenticeship in 1896. From 1904 to 1907, Dick returned to the Glasgow School of Art to take a mixture of day and evening classes in drawing and sculpture. In 1907, he graduated and accepted a teaching position at the Bellshill Academy in Lanarkshire but moved to London in 1908. There Dick took evening classes at the South London Technical School of Art whilst working as a studio assistant for the sculptor Edwin Whitney-Smith. Also in 1908, Dick had his first work exhibited at the Royal Academy in London. He earned further recognition in 1911 with a marble bust of Harry Lauder which was also shown at the Royal Academy.

In 1914 Dick married Catherine Emma Treadwell, with whom he had three children. The couple lived in the St John's Wood area of London until 1938 when they purchased a large house and studio in Maida Vale, where they lived for the rest of their lives.

=== World War I ===
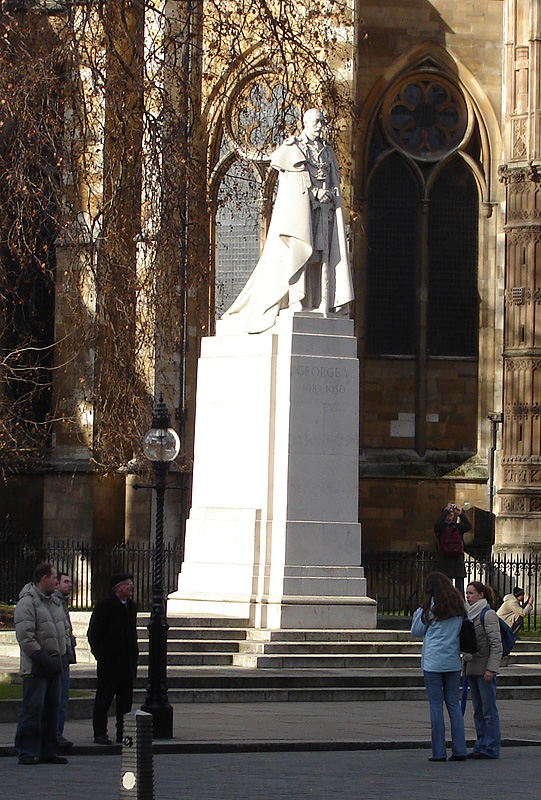
Statue of King George V by William Reid Dick, outside Westminster Abbey, London. (January 2006)

In September 1914 Dick joined the Territorial Army and from 1915 to 1919 served with the Royal Engineers in both France and Palestine. When Dick enlisted in September 1914 he joined the 5th London Field Ambulance section of the Royal Army Medical Corps and subsequently transferred to the 3rd Army Field Survey Co, part of the Royal Engineers and then the 7th Field Survey Co. He was described as a photographer with the 7th Field Survey Co. His Army Service record shows his profession as "sculptor". He was awarded the 1914-15 Star and the British War and Victory Medals. While serving in northern France, Dick produced a number of small statuettes by using the local clay deposits.

=== Post-war career ===
Dick designed several war memorials notably at Bushey, at Rickmansworth and the eagle sculpture atop the Royal Air Force Memorial on the Victoria Embankment in London. He received a major commission for the Kitchener Memorial Chapel (1922–25) in St Paul's Cathedral, London. The focal point of this design was a Pièta, which won a gold medal at the Paris International Exhibition of Modern Decorative and Industrial Arts in 1925. These works secured his reputation and election to the Royal Academy in 1928, having been elected an Associate member in 1921. His work was part of the sculpture event in the art competition at the 1928 Summer Olympics. In 1935 Dick was Knighted and elected President of the Royal Society of British Sculptors, a post he held until 1938. From 1938 to 1952 Dick served as King's Sculptor in Ordinary for Scotland and then, from 1952 until his death, Dick was the Queen's Sculptor in Ordinary for Scotland. He attended numerous royal events and created several portraits and memorials to members of the Royal Family plus several busts of political and artistic figures of the time.

Alongside the public monuments and memorials Dick created he also sculpted busts and statuettes which he exhibited on a regular basis at the Royal Academy, at the Royal Glasgow Institute of the Fine Arts, the Royal Scottish Academy, the Royal Scottish Watercolour Society and at the Paris Salon. Dick was elected to the Royal Scottish Academy in 1939. Throughout his career, Dick served on numerous committees, among these the Royal Fine Art Commission (1928–42), the Royal Mint Advisory Committee (1936–53), and the Board of Trustees of the Tate Gallery (1934–41).

Dick died at his home in Maida Vale and was cremated at Golders Green crematorium. In October 1963 a memorial tablet to him was unveiled in the crypt of St Paul's Cathedral. His archives are held by the Tate Gallery.

== Public works ==
=== 1914–1929 ===
Image	Title / subject	Location and coordinates	Date	Type	Material	Dimensions	Designation	Wikidata	Notes
More images	Monument to Harry Dwight Ripley	East Finchley Cemetery, London	1914	Statue and plinth	Bronze and rough granite		Grade II listed	Q27085920	
	Angus Watson and Co Ltd war memorial	Ellison Buildings, Newcastle upon Tyne	1920	Plaque	Bronze				
More images	War memorial	Churchyard of St Mary's, Rickmansworth	1921	Cenotaph with sculptures of Grief & Victory	Stone	4.3m tall	Grade II	Q26583838	
More images	War memorial	Council Office Gardens, Rickmansworth	1921	Statue on plinth	Bronze and brick		Grade II	Q26631648	Originally part of the Rickmansworth war memorial, relocated 1978.
More images	War memorial	Bushey, Hertfordshire	1922	Sculpture	Stone	4.1m tall	Grade II	Q26397596	
More images	Royal Air Force war memorial	Victoria Embankment, London	1923	Sculpture on pillar	Bronze and stone		Grade II*	Q7373614	Architect: Sir Reginald Blomfield.
	Pietà	All Souls' Chapel, St Paul's Cathedral, London	1925	Sculpture group on altar	Portland stone				
More images	Lord Kitchener	All Souls' Chapel, St Paul's Cathedral, London	1925	Effigy on tomb chest	Marble				
	St Michael & St George	All Souls' Chapel, St Paul's Cathedral, London	c. 1925	Two statues					
More images	Menin Gate	Ypres, Belgium	1927	Decoration & sculpture	Stone			Q1822397	Architect: Reginald Blomfield.

=== 1930–1934 ===
Image	Title / subject	Location and coordinates	Date	Type	Material	Dimensions	Designation	Wikidata	Notes
More images	Leverhulme Memorial	Port Sunlight, Merseyside	1930	Obelisk with sculpture group	Granite and bronze		Grade II	Q15979036	Architect, James Lomax-Simpson.
More images	The Spirit of Welcome	Nottingham Council House, Nottingham	1931	Statue	Bronze		Grade II*		
More images	Controlled Energy	Unilever House, London	1932	Two sculpture groups	Stone		Grade II		
More images	Arras Memorial	Faubourg d'Amiens Cemetery, France	1932	Sculpture and decoration				Q2782982	Architect, Edwin Lutyens.
More images	Arras Flying Services Memorial	Faubourg d'Amiens Cemetery, France	1932	Obelisk and globe	Stone			Q2674251	Architect, Edwin Lutyens
More images	Statue of David Livingstone	Victoria Falls, Zimbabwe	1934	Statue		3.6m tall		Q108044157	
	Lord Irwin	Coronation Park, Delhi	1934	Statue on pedestal	Stone and red sandstone				Red sandstone pedestal designed by Edwin Lutyens

=== 1935–1939 ===
Image	Title / subject	Location and coordinates	Date	Type	Material	Dimensions	Designation	Wikidata	Notes
More images	Earl of Willingdon	Coronation Park, Delhi	1936	Statue on pedestal	Stone and red sandstone			Q105436289	A bronze version of the statue, from 1936, is sited at the Chennai Fort Museum
	Boy with a Frog	Queen Mary's Garden, Regent's Park, London	1936	Sculpture and fountain	Bronze and marble		Grade II	Q26521530	
	John Soane	Lothbury facade, Bank of England, City of London	1930–1937	Statue in alcove	Portland stone			Q30410805	Architect, Herbert Baker.
	Boy with Goose	27 Poultry, City of London	1936–1937	Two sculptures	Stone		Grade I		Architect, Edwin Lutyens.
	Untitled	Adelaide House, King William Street, London	1936–1937	Statue with globe	Granite and bronze		Grade II		
More images	Art and Science	Selfridges, Oxford Street, London	1936–1937	Two statues	Bronze		Grade II*		
More images	Sir James Caird, 1st Baronet, of Glenfarquhar	National Maritime Museum, London	1937	Bust	Marble				
	The Herald	85 Fleet Street, London	1938–1939	Sculpture	Bronze	1.9m high	Grade II		Architect, Edwin Lutyens.
More images	George V	Howard Davis Park, Jersey	1939	Statue on pedestal	Bronze and granite			Q99528341	Completed by Dick following death of sculptor Francis William Doyle Jones in June 1938.
	King George V and Queen Mary	St George's Chapel, Windsor Castle	1939 and later	Chest tomb effigies	Marble		Grade I		

=== 1940 and later ===
Image	Title / subject	Location and coordinates	Date	Type	Material	Dimensions	Designation	Wikidata	Notes
	Franklin Delano Roosevelt	Kelvingrove Museum, Glasgow	c. 1946	Statue	Bronze				
More images	Statue of George V	Old Palace Yard, London	1947	Statue on pedestal	Portland stone	3m tall	Grade II	Q7604483	Architect, Giles Gilbert Scott.
More images	Franklin Delano Roosevelt	Grosvenor Square, London	1948	Statue on pedestal	Bronze and stone	3m tall	Grade II	Q25339025	
	Horlicks Limited War Memorial	Stoke Poges Lane, Slough	1949	Sculpture on pedestal	Bronze and limestone		Grade II	Q66479528	
More images	Self Sacrifice, Lady Godiva	Broadgate, Coventry	1949	Statue on pedestal	Bronze and Portland stone		Grade II*	Q17540305	
More images	Queen Mary	Marlborough Road, The Mall, London	1967	Portrait medallion	Stone and slate			Q27950126	

== Other works ==
- Bust of Lady Rhoda Birley in 1908?.
- A series of figures for St Andrew's House in Edinburgh, 1939, representing Architecture, Statecraft, Health, Agriculture, Fisheries and Education
- Bronze bust of Winston Churchill, 1943.
- A bust of George V for the Mansion House in London.
- A marble bust of Edwin Lutyens, 1932, for the Marble Hall of Rashtrapati Bhavan, New Delhi
- Bust of Queen Elizabeth the Queen Mother in Bolton Town Hall, c. 1946
- Bust of Adelaide Stoll, London Coliseum

Several public galleries, including the Tate in Britain and the Art Gallery of New South Wales in Sydney, hold collections of works by Dick.
