= Old Palace Yard =

Area nearby the Palace of Westminster

Coordinates: 51.499206°N 0.1255037°W

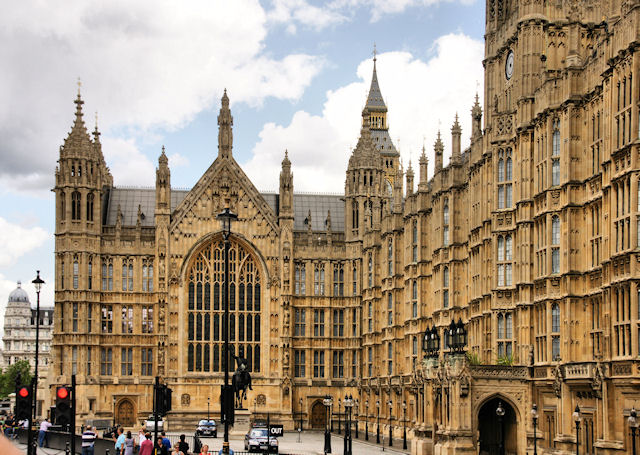
Old Palace Yard and the Palace of Westminster, with the statue of Richard Coeur de Lion in the middle and the Peers' Entrance on the right

Old Palace Yard is a paved open space in the City of Westminster, England. It lies between the Palace of Westminster to its north and east and Westminster Abbey to its west. It is known as the site of executions, including those of Sir Walter Raleigh, Guy Fawkes and other conspirators of the Gunpowder Plot, and James Hamilton, 1st Duke of Hamilton, following the Battle of Preston.

St Margaret Street/Abingdon Street divides Old Palace Yard into two parts, running diagonally from the north-west to the south-east. The eastern, larger part belongs to the grounds of the Palace of Westminster, the seat of the Parliament of the United Kingdom. To the north of the Yard is St Stephen's Entrance, the public entrance into the Palace, as well as the great South Window of Westminster Hall. Standing near this window and facing away from it is a bronze equestrian statue of Richard Coeur de Lion (Richard I of England, also known as "Richard the Lionheart"). Created by Baron Carlo Marochetti, the statue was completed in 1856 and installed in its present location in 1860. The eastern side of Old Palace Yard is defined by the West Front of the Palace, which is part of the precincts of the House of Lords; the carriage porch of the Peers' Entrance marks the middle of this frontage, and the Victoria Tower its southern end.

Access to this part of Old Palace Yard is restricted for security reasons by means of concrete barriers. For most of the year it is used as a car park for the House of Lords, but it is cleared of barriers and street furniture for the annual State Opening of Parliament, the formal opening of the legislative session by the British monarch. Conveyed from Buckingham Palace to Parliament in a horse-drawn carriage, the monarch passes through the Yard en route to the Sovereign's Entrance, at the foot of the Victoria Tower.

The western part of Old Palace Yard is freely accessible to the public. To its west are located the Henry VII Chapel and the Chapter House of Westminster Abbey, while to its south stands 6–7 Old Palace Yard, the sole survivor of the row of houses that used to surround the Yard. The building is now part of the Parliamentary Estate. Close by is a statue of King George V, made of Portland stone; sculpted by Sir William Reid Dick and unveiled in 1947, it stands on a pedestal by Sir Giles Gilbert Scott and faces the Peers' Entrance of the Palace of Westminster. In 2002, an analemmatic sundial was fitted into the Yard's pavement in front of the statue, as a gift to Queen Elizabeth II from Parliament on the occasion of her Golden Jubilee.

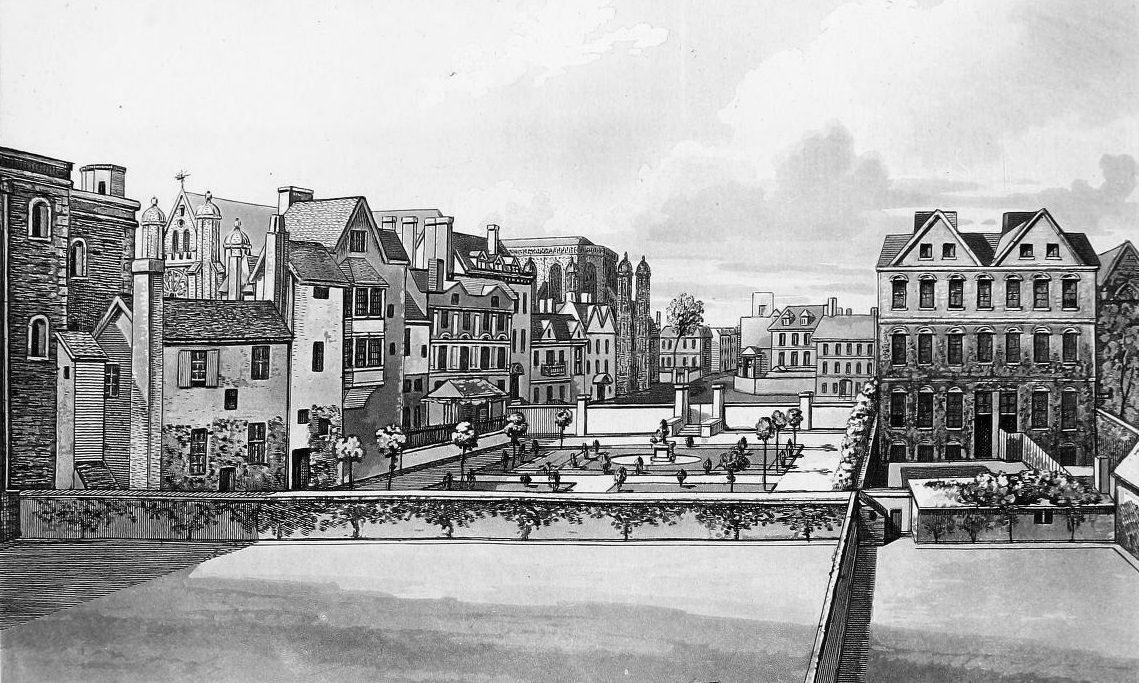
Old Palace Yard in 1720, showing the Jewel Tower at far left and the east end of Westminster Abbey at centre

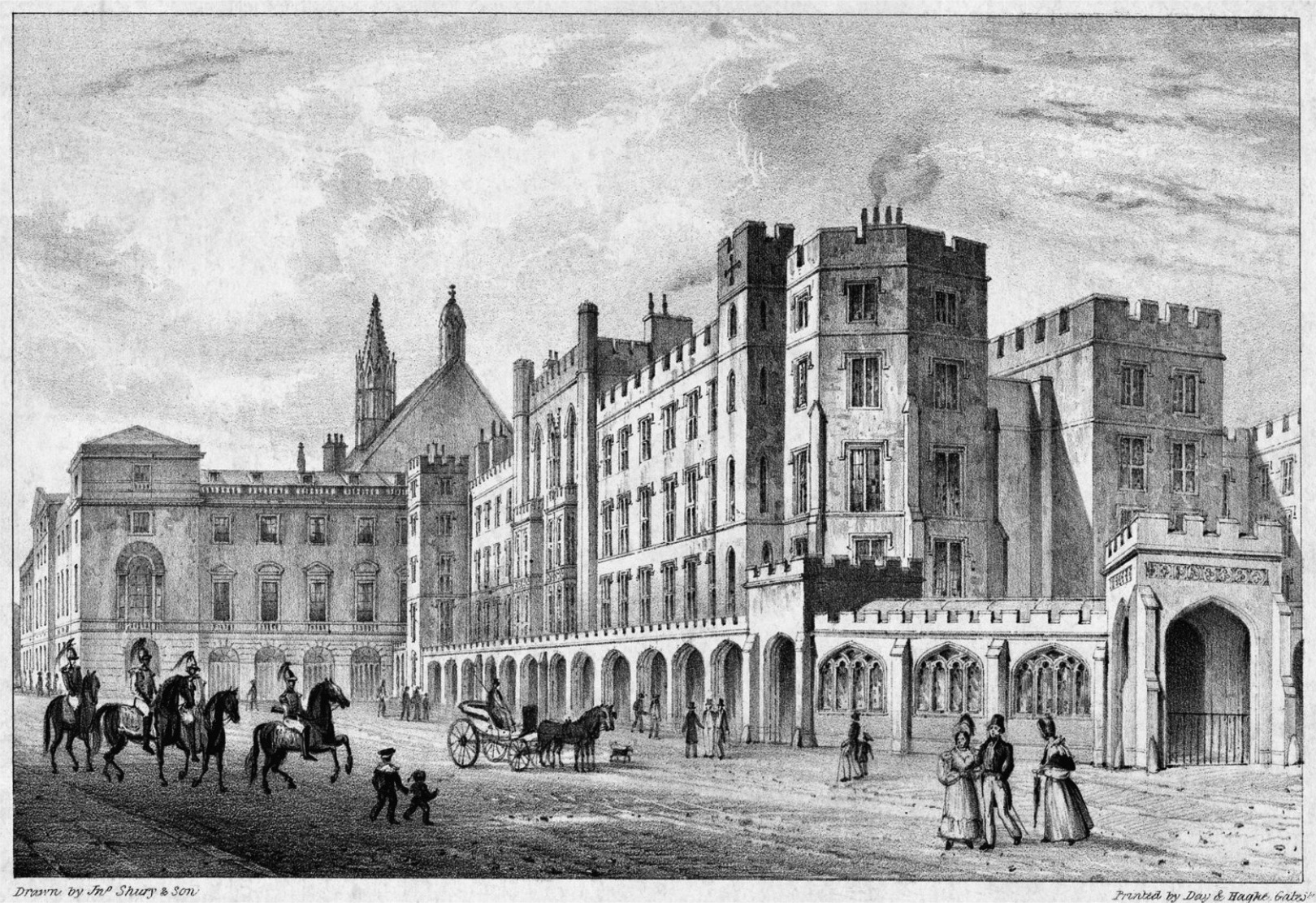
Parliament before the 1834 fire that destroyed most of its mediaeval buildings, with Old Palace Yard in the foreground

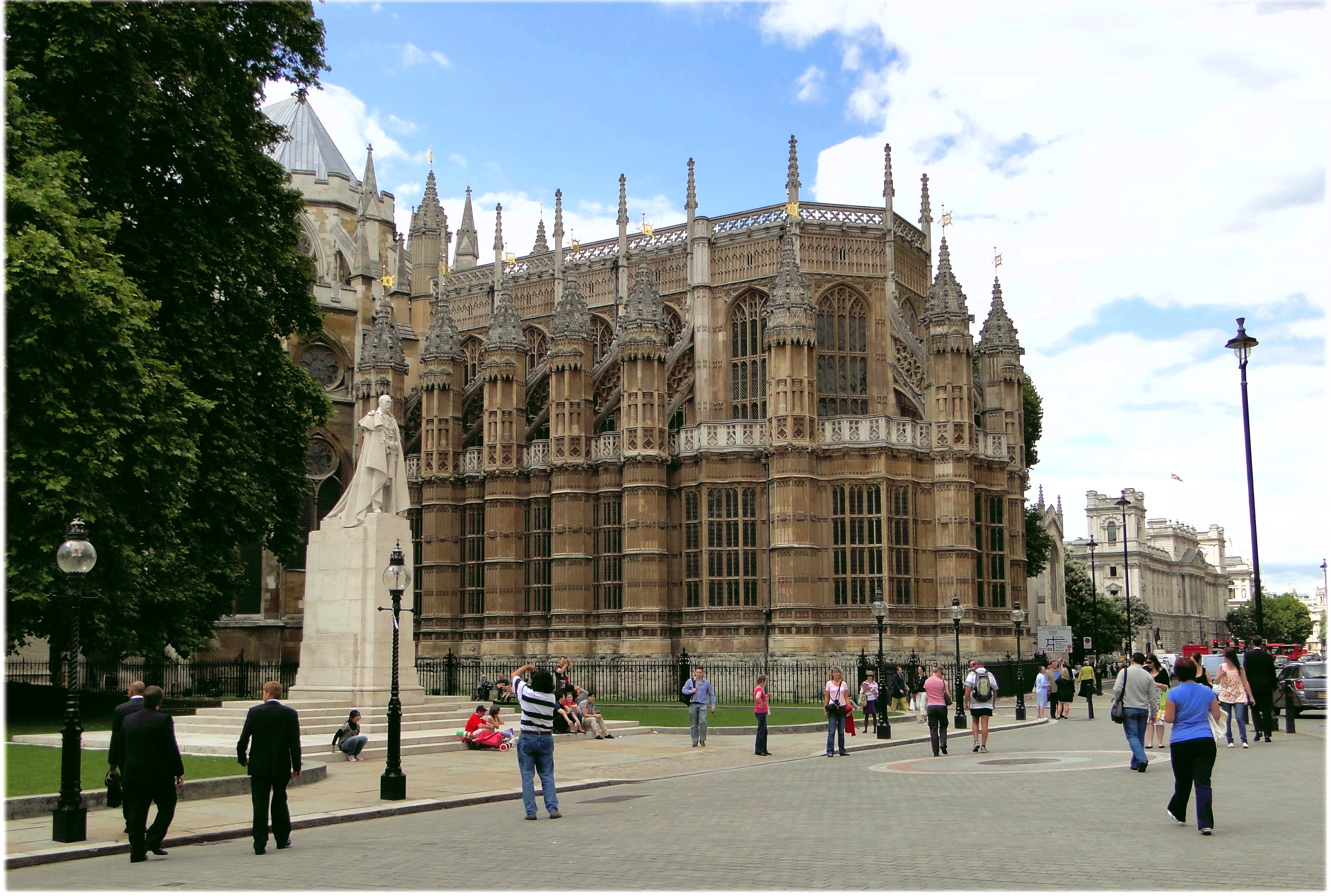
The statue of George V and the Henry VII Chapel of Westminster Abbey

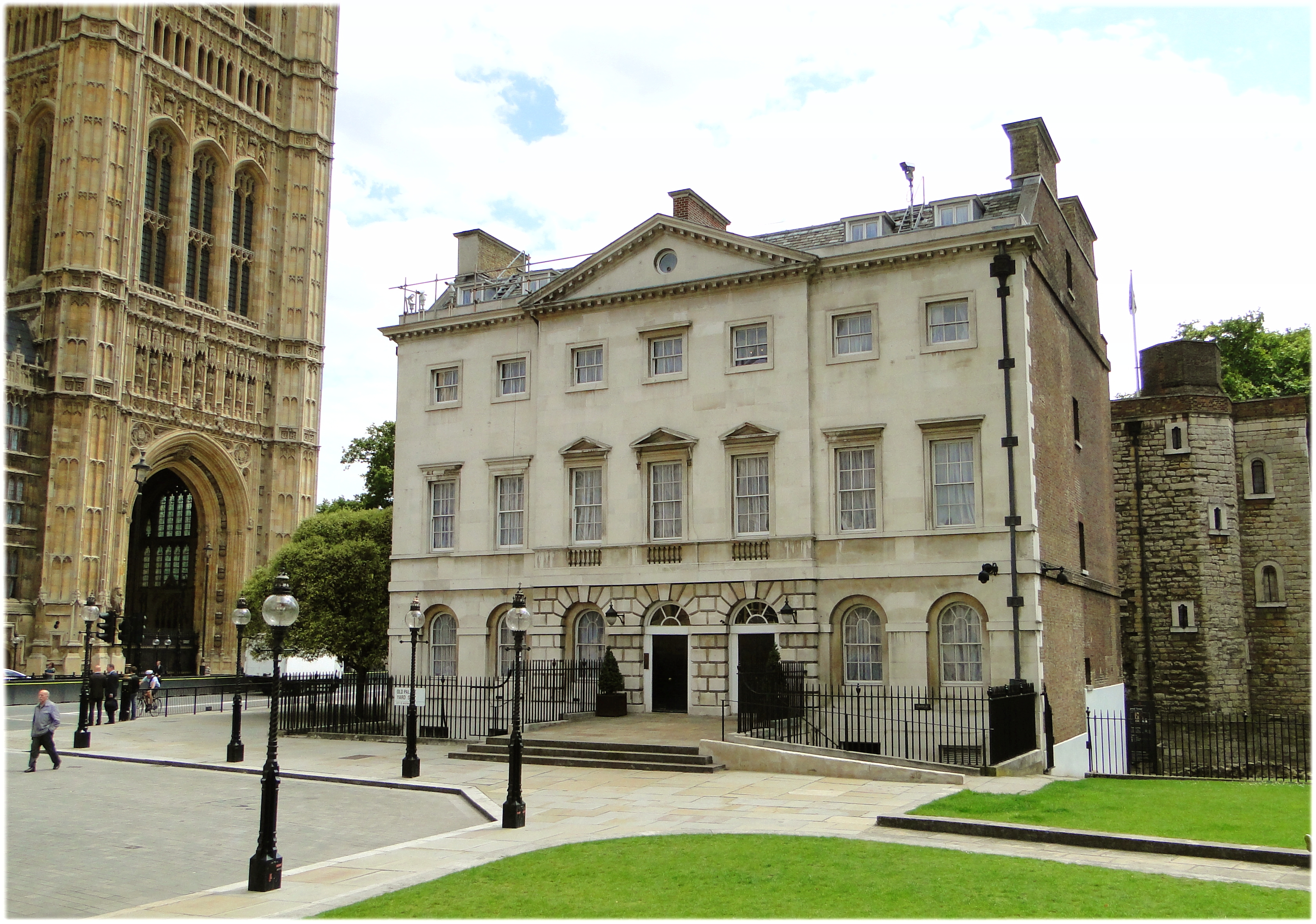
The Georgian 6–7 Old Palace Yard, now part of the Parliamentary Estate, is the only visible reminder that Old Palace Yard was once a residential street.

== See also ==
- New Palace Yard
