= Statue of David Livingstone, Victoria Falls =

Statue in Zimbabwe

Coordinates: 17°55′22″S 25°50′50″E

Statue of David Livingstone
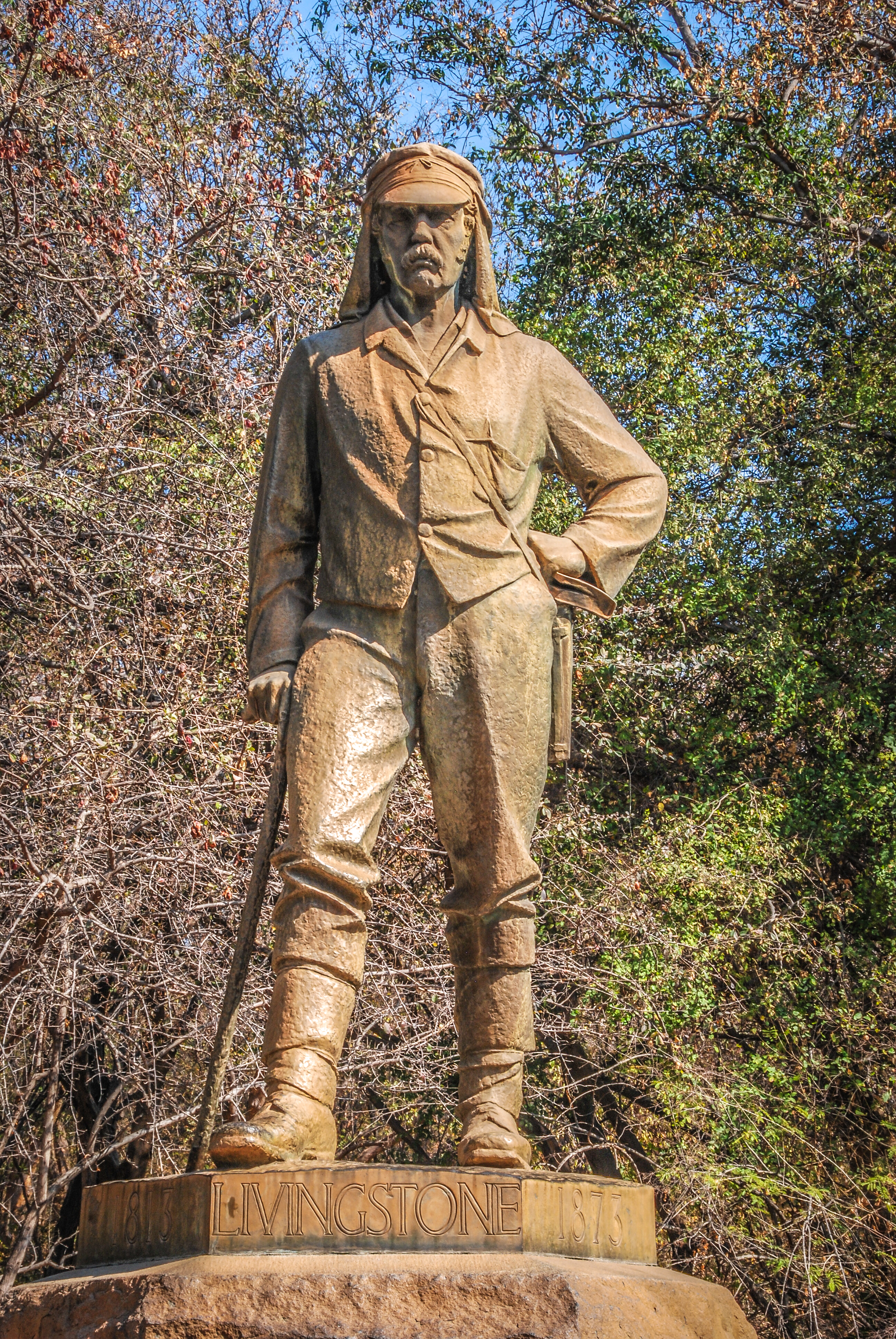
- The memorial monument facing Victoria Falls
- Designer: Sir William Reid Dick
- Type: Sculpture
- Material: Bronze
- Beginning date: 1934
- Opening date: 1954

The Statue of David Livingstone on the Zimbabwean side of the Victoria Falls is erected towards Devil's Cataract in the western bank of the falls. The statue has an inscription that states that David Livingstone visited the falls in 1855 when he documented his first impression on the beauty of the waterfalls during his first encounter when he named the falls after Queen Victoria.

There has been two failed attempts to remove the statue, first attempt was in 2001 by Zimbabwe's liberation war veterans who regarded the artwork as a painful reminder of the British colonial era, and the second attempt was by the Zambian government in 2004, the government wanted the statue moved to the Zambian side of the falls during their 150th anniversary celebrations of the David Livingstone's discovery of the falls.
