= Palace of Westminster =

Meeting place of the UK Parliament

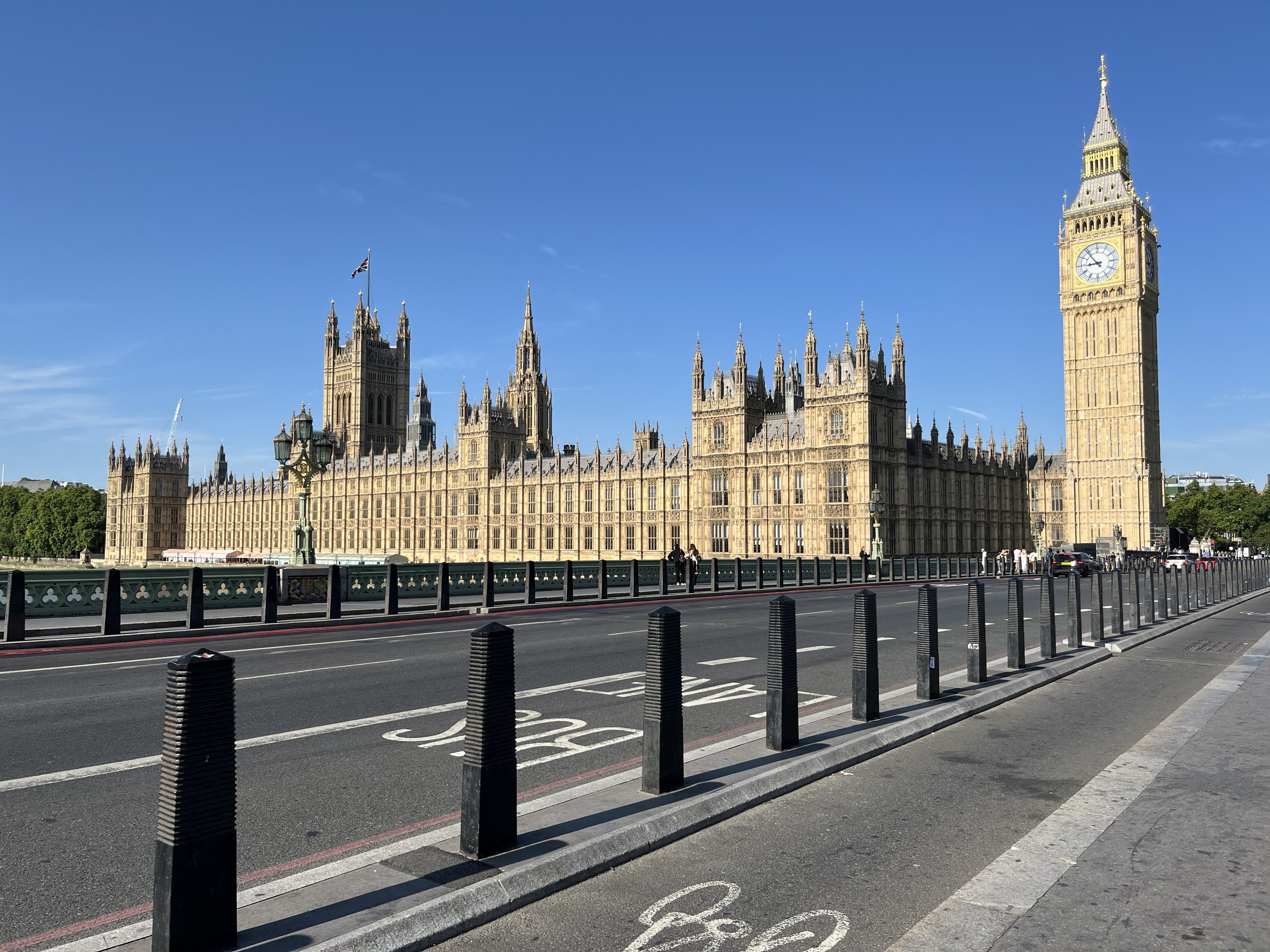

- Location within Central London

General information
- Architectural style: Perpendicular Gothic Revival
- Location: Westminster, London, SW1A 0AA, United Kingdom
- Coordinates: 51°29′57″N 00°07′29″W
- Years built: 1016 and later (original building); 1840–1876 (reconstructed)
- Destroyed: 1834 (due to fire)
- Owner: King Charles III in right of the Crown

Technical details
- Floor area: 112,476 m^{2} (1,210,680 ft^{2})

Design and construction
- Architects: Charles Barry and Augustus Pugin

UNESCO World Heritage Site
- Official name: Palace of Westminster, Westminster Abbey, and St Margaret's Church
- Type: Cultural
- Criteria: i, ii, iv
- Designated: 1987 (11th session)
- Reference no.: 426
- Country: United Kingdom
- Region: Europe
- Extensions: 2008

Listed Building – Grade I
- Official name: Houses of Parliament and The Palace of Westminster
- Designated: 5 February 1970
- Reference no.: 1226284

The Palace of Westminster is the meeting place of the Parliament of the United Kingdom and is located in London, England. It is colloquially known as the Houses of Parliament after the House of Commons and the House of Lords, the two legislative chambers which occupy the building. The palace is one of the centres of political life in the United Kingdom; "Westminster" has become a metonym for the UK Parliament and government, and the Westminster system of government commemorates the name of the palace. The Elizabeth Tower of the palace houses the bell nicknamed Big Ben and is a landmark of London and the United Kingdom in general. The palace has been a Grade I listed building since 1970 and part of a UNESCO World Heritage Site since 1987.

The building was originally constructed in the eleventh century as a royal palace and was the primary residence of the kings of England until 1512, when a fire destroyed the royal apartments. The monarch moved to the adjacent Palace of Whitehall, but the remainder of the palace continued to serve as the home of the Parliament of England, which had met there since the 13th century. In 1834 a second, larger fire destroyed the majority of the palace, but the eleventh century Westminster Hall was saved and incorporated into the replacement building.

The competition to design the new palace was won by the architect Charles Barry, who chose a Gothic Revival style for the building. Construction started in 1840 and lasted for 30 years, suffering delays, cost overruns, and the deaths of Barry and his assistant, Augustus Pugin. This new palace is notable for its ornate decoration, and contributed to the proliferation of Gothic Revival architecture in other places. The palace contains chambers for the House of Commons, House of Lords, and the monarch, and has a floor area of 1,210,680 ft^{2} (112,476 m^{2}). Extensive repairs had to be made after the Second World War, including rebuilding the destroyed Commons chamber. Despite further conservation work having been carried out since, the palace is still in need of some repairs.

== History ==
=== Old Palace ===
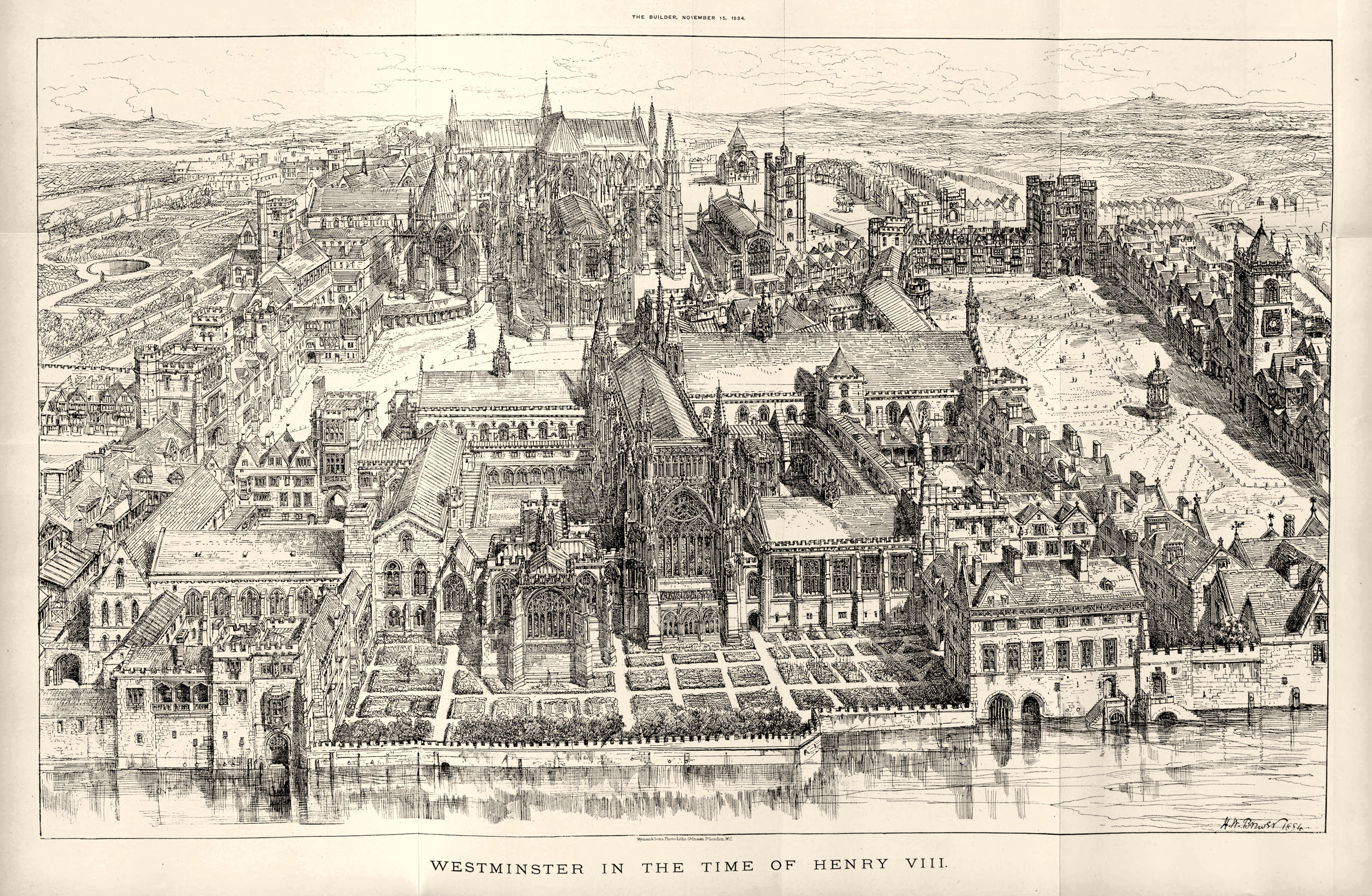
Conjectural restoration of Westminster during the reign of Henry VIII (1509–1547). St Stephen's Chapel is in the centre, with the White Chamber and Painted Chamber on the left and Westminster Hall on the right.

The site of the current palace and Houses of Parliament may have been used by Cnut during his reign from 1016 to 1035, and from c. 1045 – c. 1050 Edward the Confessor built a palace and the first Westminster Abbey. The oldest surviving part of the palace is Westminster Hall, which dates from the reign of William II (r. 1087–1100). The palace was the principal residence of the English monarchs in the late Medieval period. In 1512, during the early reign of Henry VIII, a fire destroyed the royal apartments of the palace. In 1534 Henry moved to the neighbouring Palace of Whitehall, formerly York Place, which he had seized from Cardinal Thomas Wolsey. Although Westminster remained a royal palace, from this point on its primary occupants were the two houses of Parliament and various courts of law.

The predecessor of Parliament, the Curia Regis, met in Westminster Hall when the king was in residence. The "Model Parliament", considered the first Parliament of England, met at the palace in 1295; while medieval parliaments of England met in a variety of locations, the palace was frequently used and developed into the body's permanent home. The palace did not have purpose-built chambers for the House of Commons or the House of Lords; instead, it used the available large gathering spaces built for the palace. In time, the Commons adapted St Stephen's Chapel for its use in the sixteenth century, and the Lords used the Painted Chamber and, from 1801, the White Chamber.

The palace underwent significant alterations from the 18th century onwards, as Parliament struggled to carry out its business in the limited available space. These included a new storage and committee rooms by John Vardy, completed in 1770; a new official residence for the Speaker of the House of Commons, completed in 1795; and significant alterations and a new building by James Wyatt, completed in 1801. The last alterations were undertaken by Sir John Soane between 1824 and 1827. They included new library facilities for both Houses of Parliament and new law courts for the Chancery and King's Bench.

=== Fire and reconstruction ===
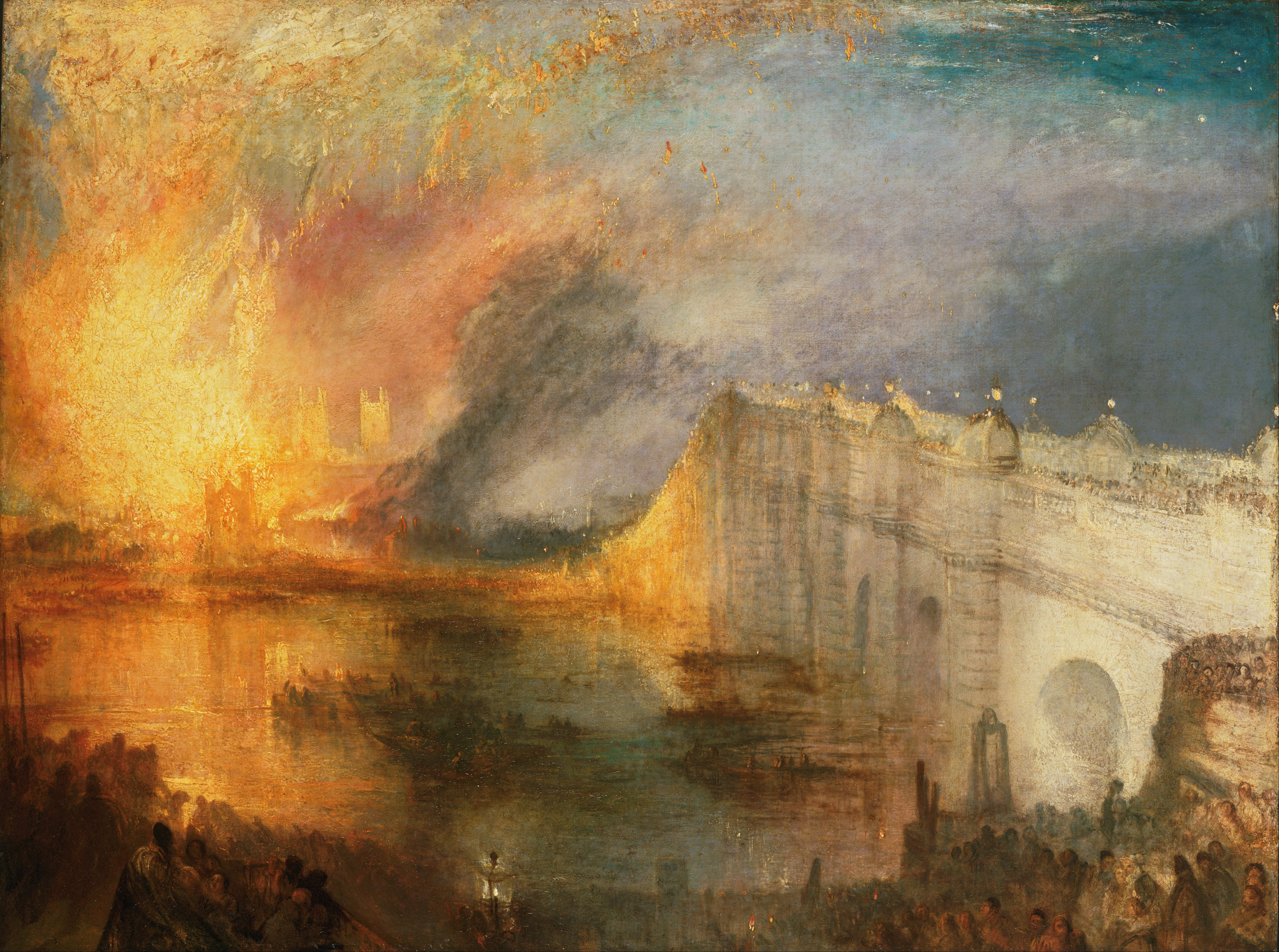
J. M. W. Turner watched the fire of 1834 and painted several canvases depicting it, including The Burning of the Houses of Lords and Commons (1835).

On 16 October 1834, a fire broke out in the palace after an overheated stove used to destroy the Exchequer's stockpile of tally sticks set fire to the House of Lords Chamber. Both Houses of Parliament were destroyed, along with most of the other buildings in the palace complex. Westminster Hall was saved thanks to firefighting efforts and a change in the direction of the wind. The Jewel Tower and the undercroft, cloisters, and chapter house of St Stephen's Chapel were the only other parts of the palace to survive.

William IV offered the almost-completed Buckingham Palace to Parliament, hoping to dispose of a residence he disliked; however, the building was considered unsuitable for parliamentary use and the gift was rejected. The Painted Chamber and White Chamber were hastily repaired for temporary use, and in 1835, following that year's General Election, the King permitted Parliament to make "plans for [its] permanent accommodation". Each house created a committee and a Perpendicular Gothic Revival design by the architect Charles Barry was chosen. Barry was inexperienced with Gothic and relied heavily on Augustus Pugin to design details. The Lords Chamber was completed in 1847, and the Commons Chamber in 1852. Although most of the work had been carried out by 1860, construction was not finished until a decade afterwards.

=== Second World War damage and restoration ===
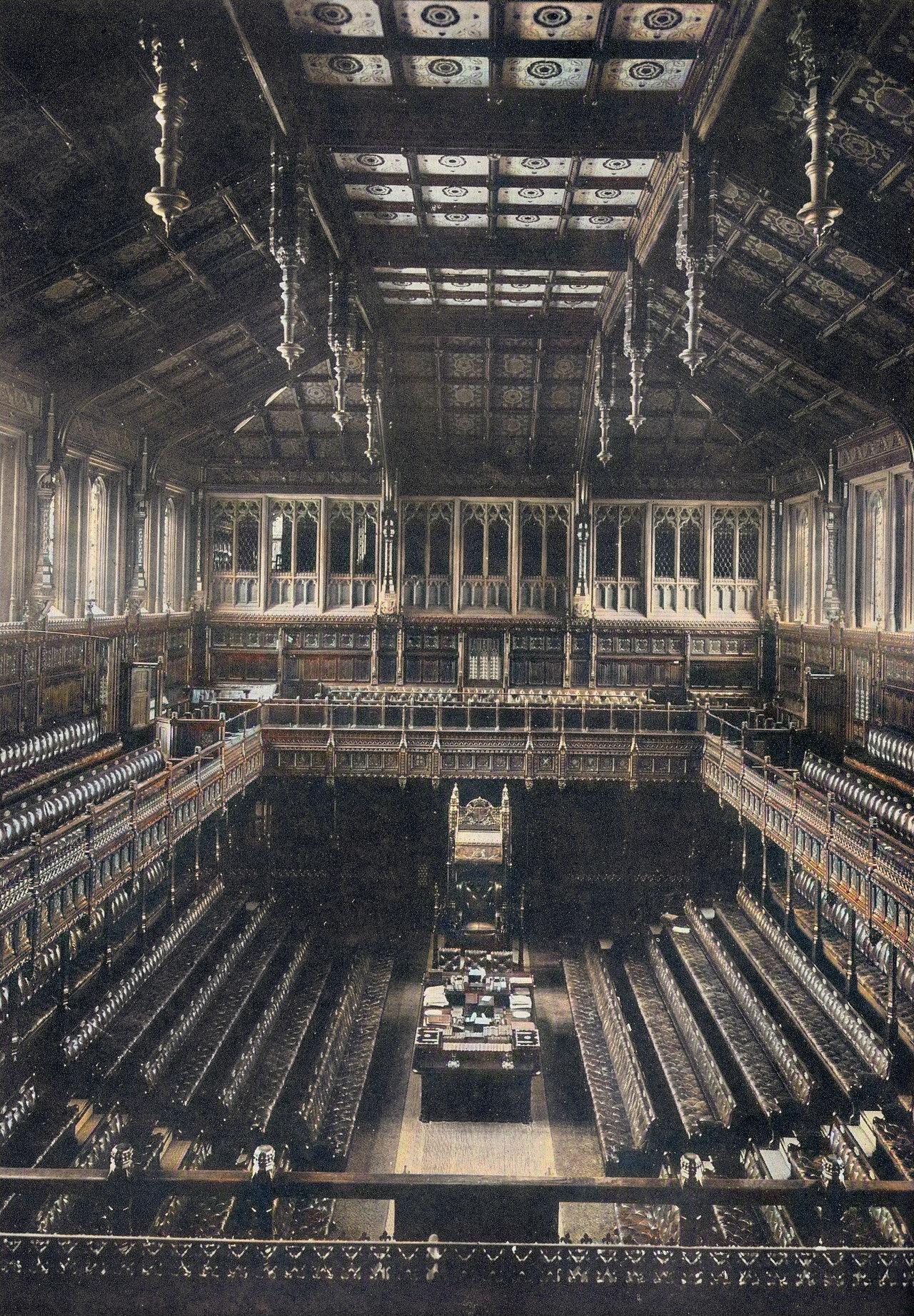
The old chamber of the House of Commons was in use between 1852 and 1941, when it was destroyed by German bombs in the course of the Second World War.

During the Second World War, the palace was hit by bombs on fourteen separate occasions. A bomb that fell on 26 September 1940 lifted the statue of Richard the Lionheart from its pedestal and bent its sword, an image that was used as a symbol of the strength of democracy, "which would bend but not break under attack".

The worst raid took place in the night of 10–11 May 1941, when the palace took at least twelve hits and three people (two policemen and Resident Superintendent of the House of Lords, Edward Elliott) were killed. The Commons Chamber and the roof of Westminster Hall were both set alight; as the firefighters could not save both, the hall was prioritised and saved, while the chamber was destroyed. The Lords Chamber and Clock Tower were damaged in the same raid. The Commons Chamber was rebuilt in a simplified style after the war, being completed in 1950.

=== Recent history ===
As the need for office space in the palace increased, Parliament acquired office space in the nearby Norman Shaw Building in 1975 and in the custom-built Portcullis House, completed in 2000. This increase has enabled all Members of Parliament (MP) to have their own office facilities.

The palace was designated a Grade I listed building in 1970 and a World Heritage Site in 1987. The fabric of the building is in urgent need of restoration. In January 2018, the House of Commons voted for both houses to vacate the palace to allow for a complete refurbishment of the building, which would take at least six years and start no sooner than 2025. In September 2022, the Restoration and Renewal Client Board, a joint committee of the House of Lords and the House of Commons, was formed to oversee the necessary works. As of February 2026, no plan had been agreed.

== Exterior ==
River front of the Palace of Westminster

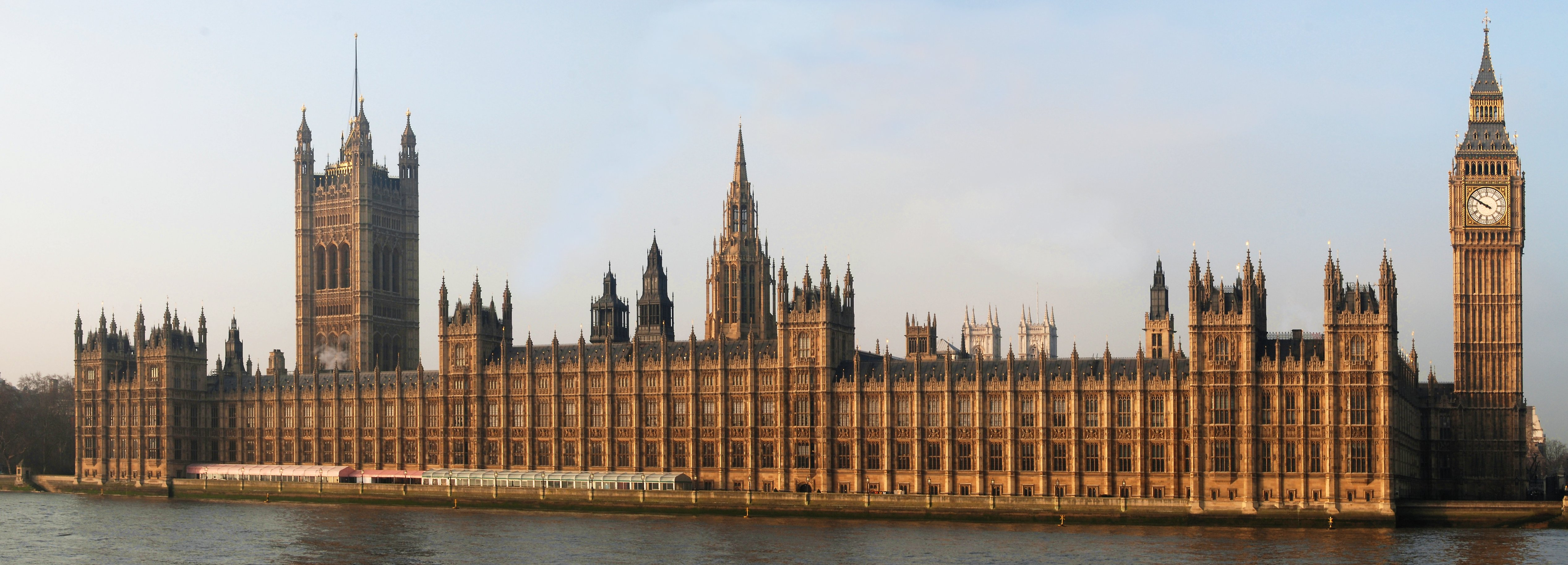
View from across the Thames in the morning...

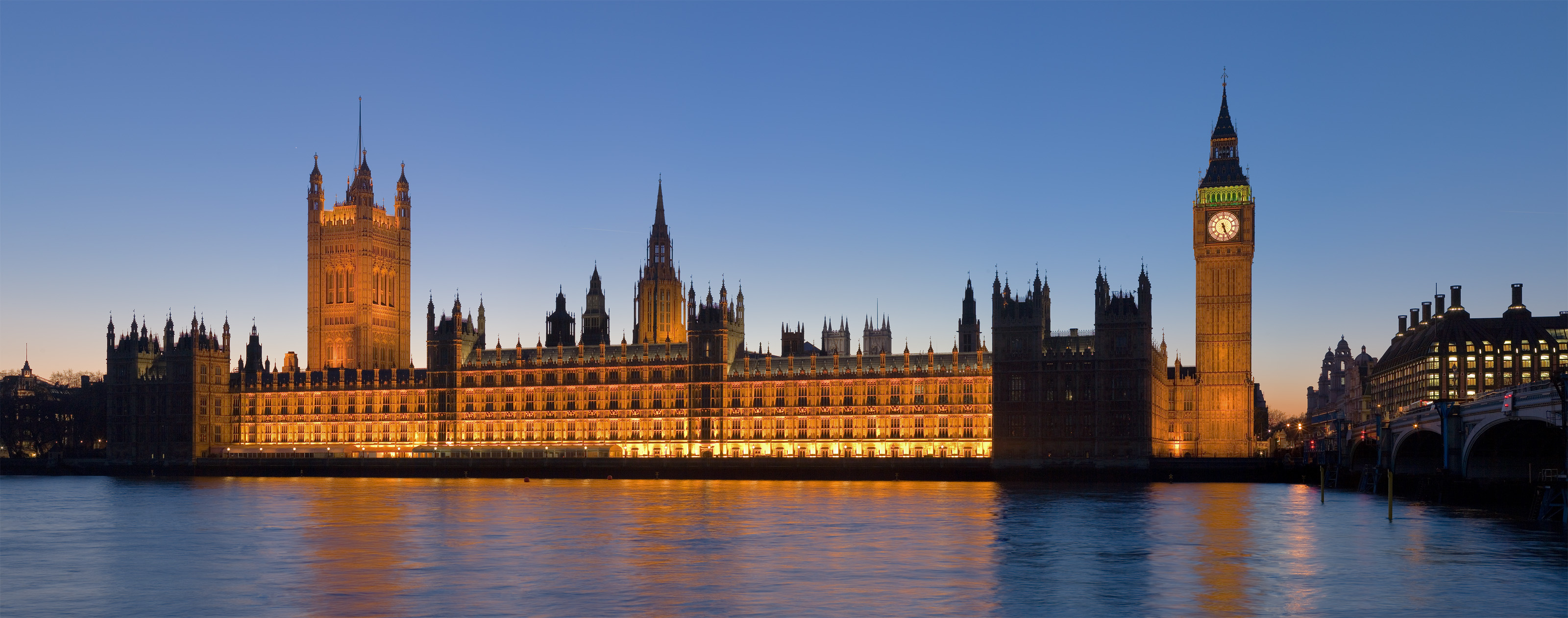
...and at dusk. Portcullis House is visible on the right.

Charles Barry's collaborative design for the Palace of Westminster uses the Perpendicular Gothic style, which was popular during the 15th century and returned during the Gothic revival of the 19th century. Barry was a classical architect, but he was aided by the Gothic architect Augustus Pugin. Westminster Hall, which was built in the 11th century and survived the fire of 1834, was incorporated in Barry's design. Pugin was displeased with the result of the work, especially with the symmetrical layout designed by Barry; he famously remarked, "All Grecian, sir; Tudor details on a classic body".

=== Stonework ===
In 1839, Charles Barry toured Britain to inspect quarries and buildings, accompanied by a committee that included two leading geologists and a stone carver. They selected Anston, a sand-coloured magnesian limestone quarried in the villages of Anston, South Yorkshire, and Mansfield Woodhouse, Nottinghamshire. Two quarries were chosen from a list of 102, with most of the stone coming from the former. A crucial consideration was transport, achieved on water via the Chesterfield Canal, the North Sea and the rivers Trent and Thames. Anston was cheaper, and "could be supplied in blocks up to four feet thick and lent itself to elaborate carving".

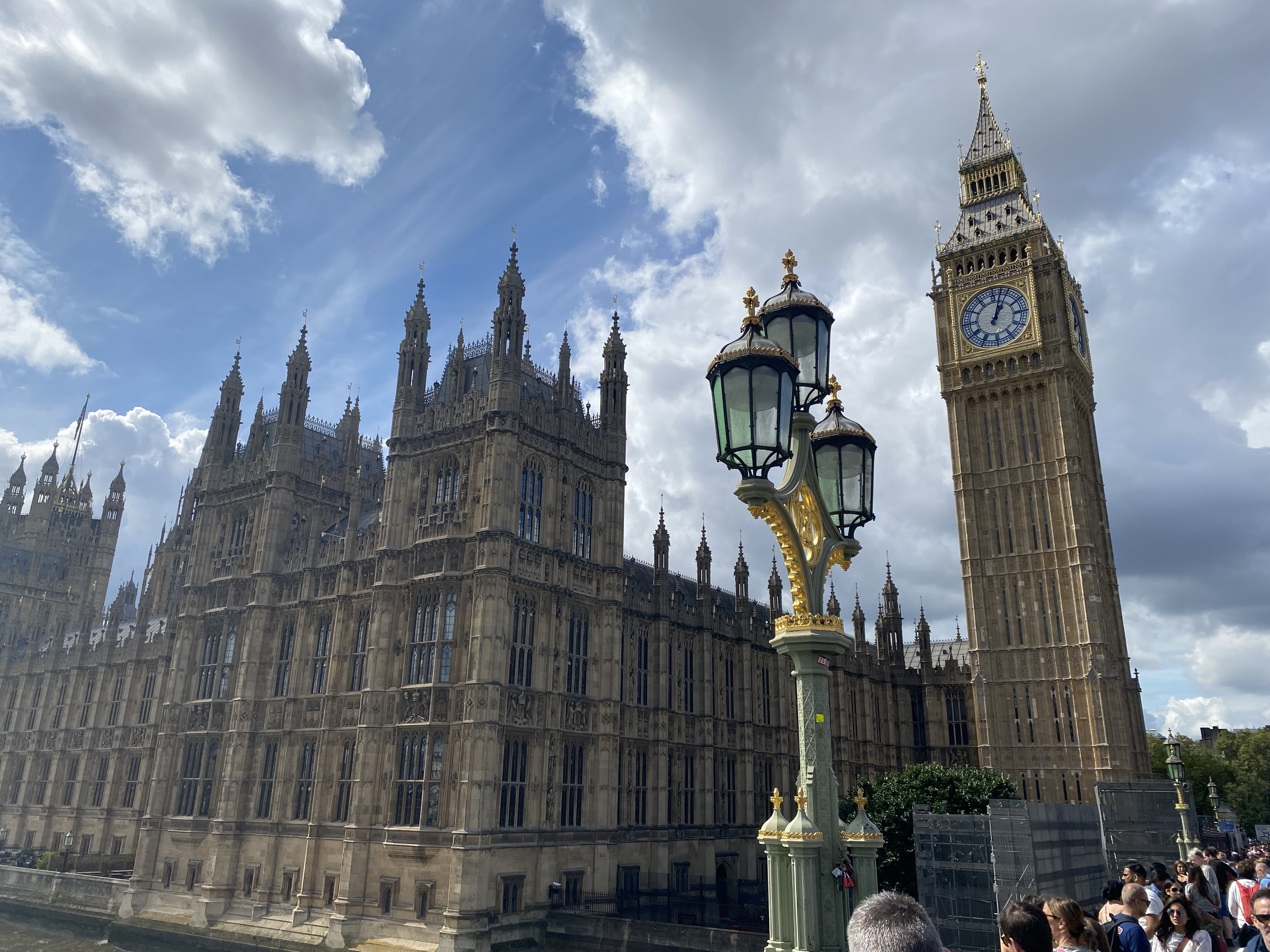
View from the Westminster Bridge, highlighting the distinctive colour of the stonework

Barry's new Palace of Westminster was rebuilt using the sand-coloured Anston limestone. However, the stone soon began to decay because of pollution and the poor quality of some of the stone used. Although such defects were clear as early as 1849, nothing was done for the remainder of the 19th century, even after much studying. During the 1910s, however, it became clear that some of the stonework would need to be replaced. In 1928, it was decided to use Clipsham stone, a honey-coloured limestone from Rutland, to replace the decayed Anston stone. The project began in the 1930s but was halted by the outbreak of the Second World War and was not completed until the 1950s. By the 1960s, pollution had again begun to damage the stonework. A stone conservation and restoration programme for the external elevations and towers began in 1981 and ended in 1994.

=== Towers ===
==== Victoria Tower ====
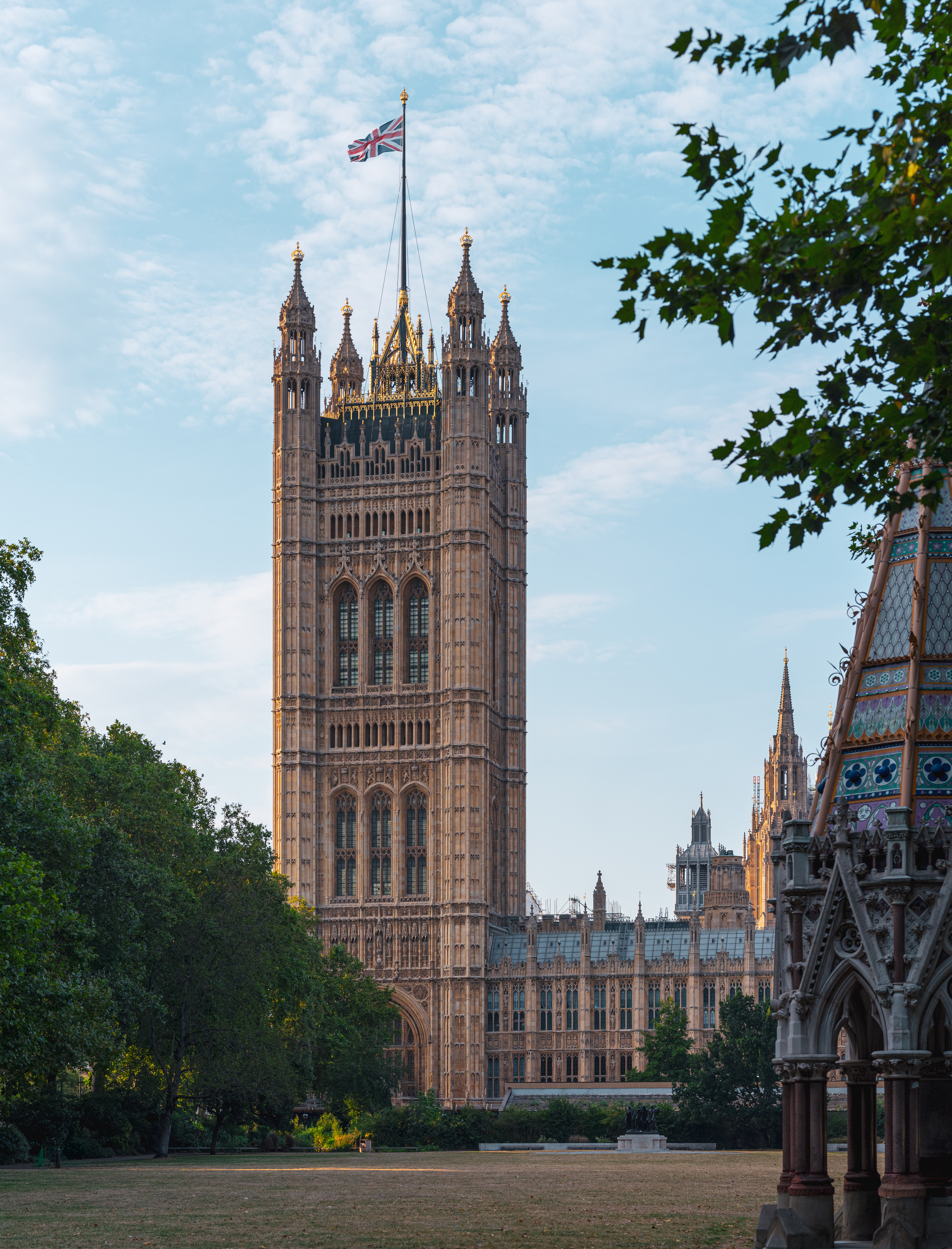
The Victoria Tower

The Palace of Westminster has three main towers. The largest and tallest is the 323-foot (98.5 m) Victoria Tower, which occupies the south-western corner of the palace. The tower was an integral part of Barry's original design, and he intended it to be the most memorable element, conceiving it as the keep of a legislative "castle". The tower was redesigned several times, and its height increased progressively; upon its completion in 1858 it was the tallest secular building in the world.

At the base of the tower is the Sovereign's Entrance, used by the monarch whenever entering the palace to open Parliament or for other state occasions. The 15 m (49 ft) high archway is richly decorated with sculptures, including statues of Saints George, Andrew and Patrick, and Queen Victoria. The main body of the tower houses the Parliamentary Archives in 5.5 miles (8.8 km) of steel shelves spread over 12 floors. The archives include the master copies of all Acts of Parliament since 1497 and important manuscripts such as the original Bill of Rights and the death warrant of King Charles I. At the top of the cast-iron pyramidal roof is a 22 m (72 ft) flagstaff, from which flies the Royal Standard (the monarch's personal flag) when the Sovereign is present in the palace. On all other days, the Union Flag flies from the mast.

==== Big Ben (Elizabeth Tower) ====
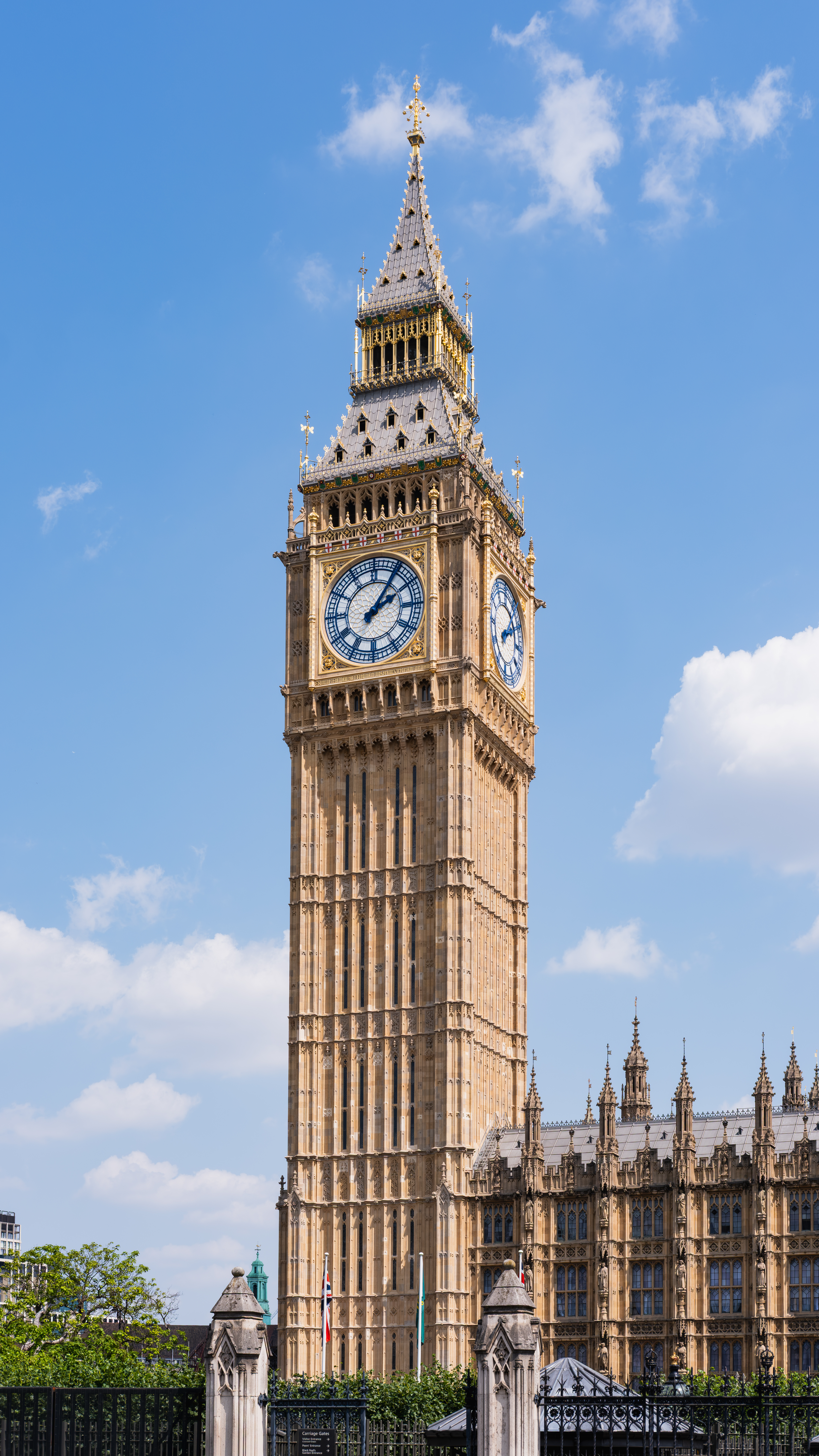
The Elizabeth Tower (Big Ben)

At the north end of the palace is the Elizabeth Tower, commonly known by the nickname "Big Ben". At 315 feet (96 m) it is only slightly shorter than the Victoria Tower, but much slimmer. It was called the Clock Tower until 2012, when it was renamed to celebrate the Diamond Jubilee of Elizabeth II. The Clock Tower was designed by Augustus Pugin and built after his death. Charles Barry asked Pugin to design the clock tower because Pugin had previously helped Barry design the palace.

The tower houses the Great Clock, which uses the original mechanism built by Edward John Dent to designs by amateur horologist Edmund Beckett Denison. It is highly accurate by nineteenth-century standards, striking the hour to within a second of the time, and remaining reliable since it entered service in 1859. The time is shown on four dials 23 feet (7 m) in diameter, which are made of milk glass and are lit from behind at night; the hour hand is 8 feet 10 inches (2.7 m) long and the minute hand 14 feet (4.3 m).

Five bells hang in the belfry above the clock. The four quarter bells strike the Westminster Chimes every quarter-hour. The largest bell strikes the hours; officially called the "Great Bell", it is generally referred to as Big Ben, a nickname of uncertain origins which, over time, has been applied to the whole tower. The original hour bell cracked during testing and was recast; the present bell later developed a crack of its own, which gives it a distinctive sound. It is the third-heaviest bell in Britain, weighing 13.8 tonnes. In the lantern at the top of Elizabeth Tower is the Ayrton Light, which is lit when either House of Parliament is sitting after dark. It was installed in 1885 at the request of Queen Victoria, so that she could see from Buckingham Palace whether the members were "at work", and named after Acton Smee Ayrton, who was First Commissioner of Works in the 1870s.

==== Central Tower ====
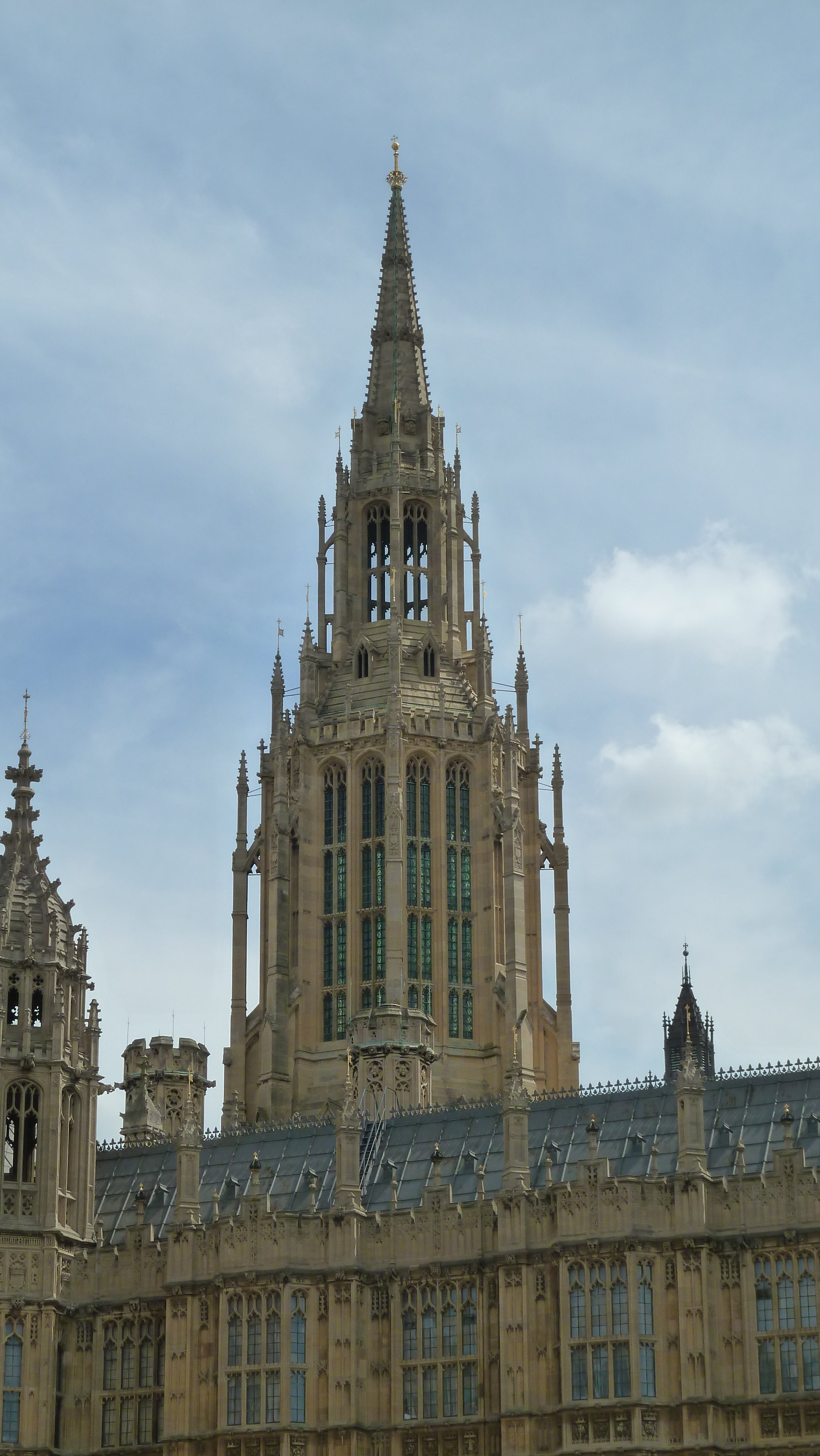
The Central Tower

The shortest of the palace's three principal towers (at 299 feet (91 m)), the octagonal Central Tower stands over the middle of the building, immediately above the Central Lobby. It was added to the plans on the insistence of Dr. David Boswell Reid, who was in charge of the ventilation of the new Houses of Parliament: his plan called for a central chimney through which what he called "vitiated air" would be drawn out of the building with the heat and smoke of about four hundred fires around the palace. To accommodate the tower, Barry was forced to lower the high ceiling he had planned for the Central Lobby and reduce the height of its windows; however, the tower proved to be an opportunity to improve the palace's exterior design, and Barry to make it a spire to balance the effect of the more massive lateral towers. The Central Tower completely failed to fulfil its stated purpose.

==== Smaller towers ====
Some other features of the palace of Westminster are known as towers. St Stephen's Tower is positioned in the middle of the west front of the palace, between Westminster Hall and Old Palace Yard, and houses the public entrance to the palace. The pavilions at the northern and southern ends of the river front are called Speaker's Tower and Chancellor's Tower respectively, after the presiding officers of the two Houses at the time of the palace's reconstruction—the Speaker of the House of Commons and the Lord Chancellor. Speaker's Tower contains Speaker's House, the official residence of the Speaker of the Commons.

As well as the pinnacles which rise from between the window bays along the fronts of the palace, numerous turrets enliven the building's skyline. Like the Central Tower, these were built for practical reasons, as they mask ventilation shafts.

=== Grounds ===
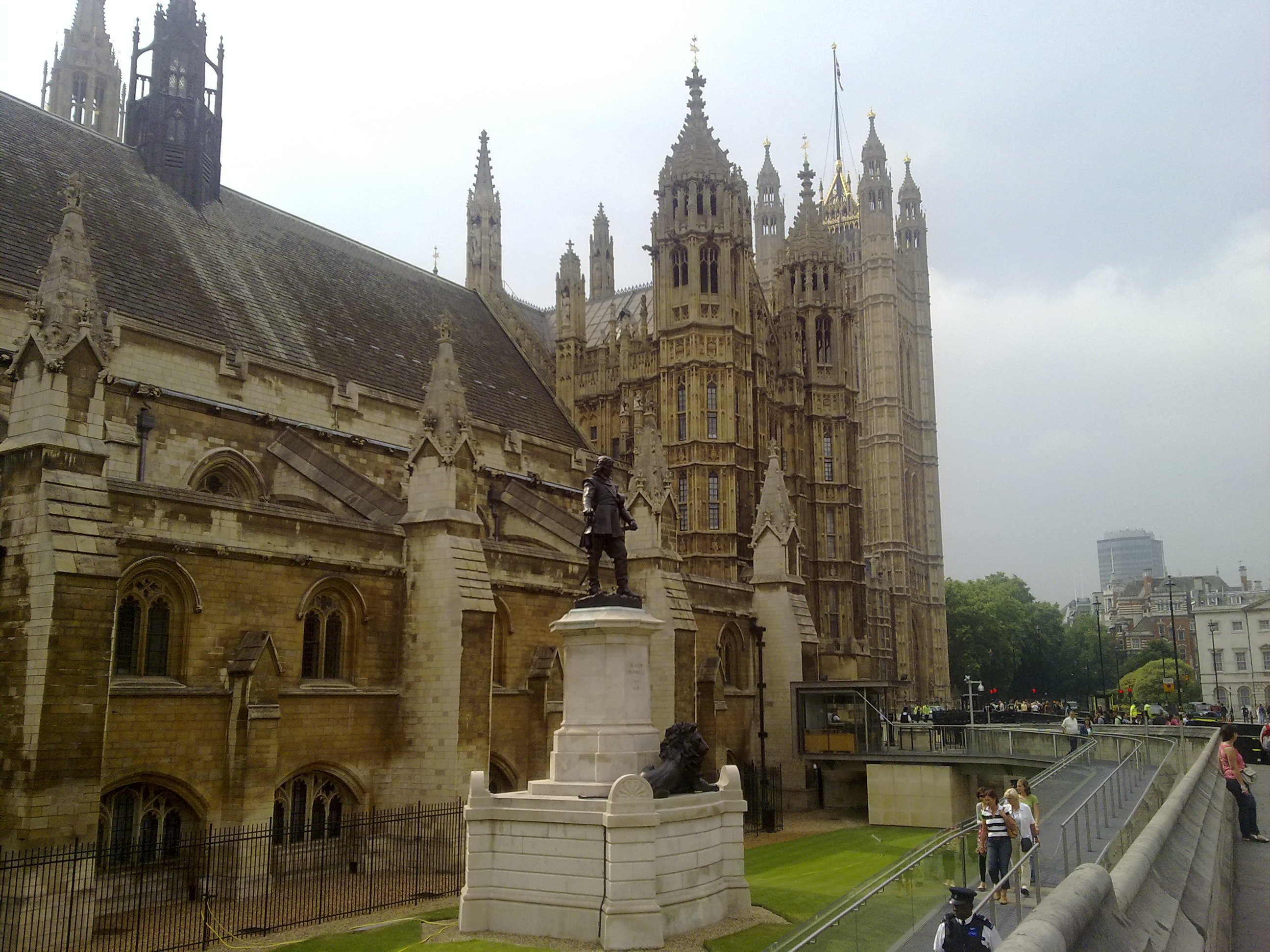
Cromwell Green, outside Westminster Hall, is the site of Hamo Thornycroft's bronze statue of Oliver Cromwell, erected amid controversy in 1899.

There are several small gardens surrounding the Palace of Westminster. Victoria Tower Gardens is open as a public park along the side of the river south of the palace. Black Rod's Garden (named after the office of Gentleman Usher of the Black Rod) is closed to the public and is used as a private entrance. Old Palace Yard, in front of the palace, is paved over and covered in concrete security blocks (see security below). Cromwell Green (also on the frontage, and in 2006 enclosed by hoardings for the construction of a new visitor centre), New Palace Yard (on the north side), and Speaker's Green (directly north of the palace) are all private and closed to the public. College Green, located opposite the House of Lords, is a small triangular green that is commonly used for television interviews with politicians.

== Interior ==
The Palace of Westminster contains over 1,100 rooms, 100 staircases and 3 miles (4.8 km) of passageways, which are spread over four floors. Offices, dining rooms and bars occupy the ground floor; the first, or principal, floor houses the main rooms of the palace, including the debating chambers, the lobbies and the libraries. The top two floors are used as committee rooms and offices.

Some of the interiors were designed and painted by J. G. Crace, working in collaboration with Pugin and others. For example, Crace decorated and gilded the ceiling of the Chapel of St. Mary Undercroft.

=== Layout ===
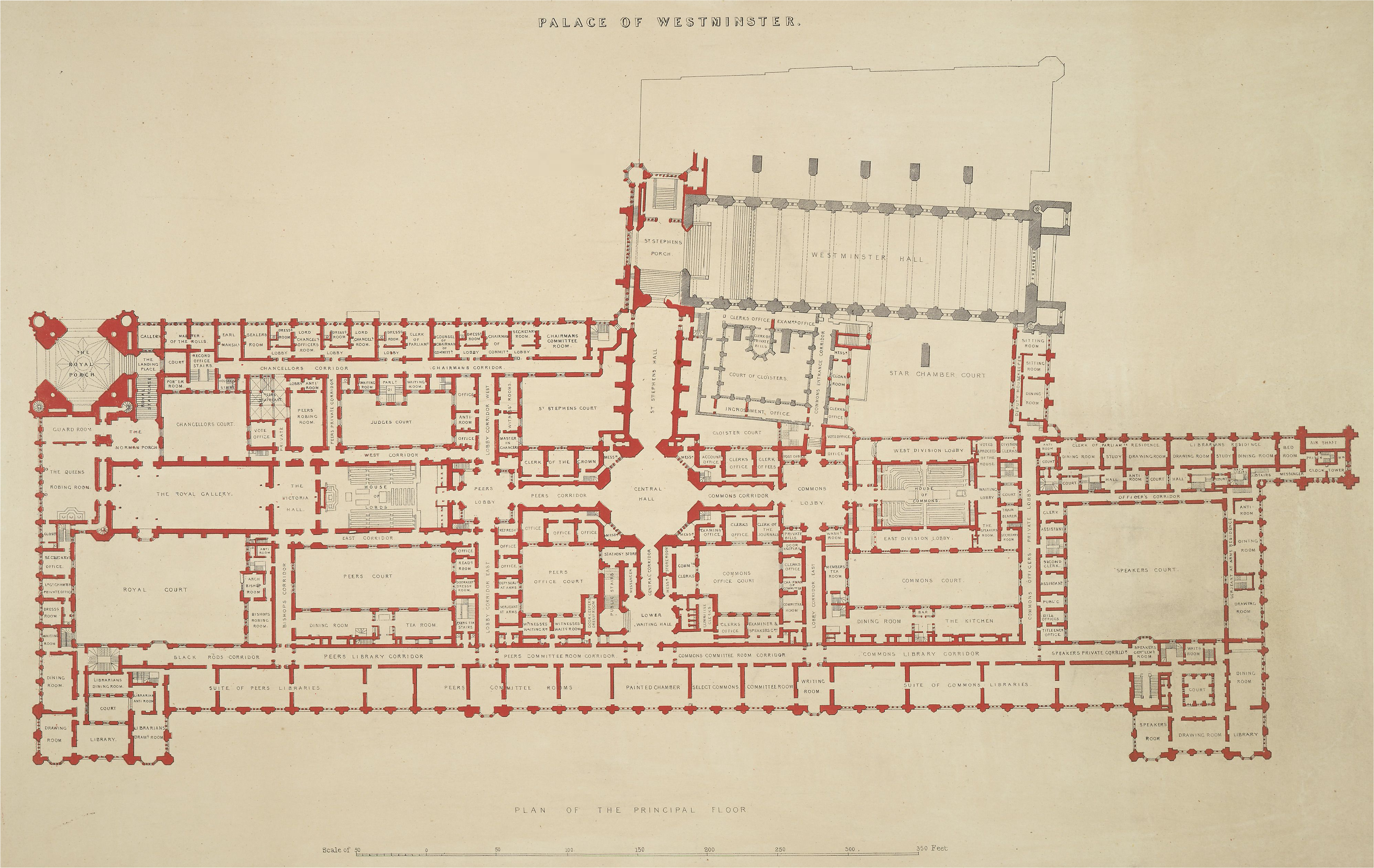
Layout of the principal floor, with north to the right. The Central Lobby is the octagonal space in the centre; the Commons chamber is to the north, with the Elizabeth Tower beyond (far-right). The Lord's Chamber is to the south, with the monarch's rooms beyond. Westminster Hall is to the west (upper-right), at an angle.

The palace is a roughly rectangular building with its long axis parallel to the River Thames. The building is planned around the Central Lobby, a large hall from which corridors lead north to the Commons Chamber, south to the Lords Chamber, and west to the public entrance and Westminster Hall; to the east are committee rooms and libraries. A suite of rooms known as the Royal Apartments is at the disposal of the reigning monarch; they lie beyond the Lords' Chamber at the far south of the palace.

The palace has separate entrances for its different users: the monarch, members of the House of Lords, members of Parliament and the public. The Sovereign's Entrance is at the base of the Victoria Tower in the south-west corner of the palace, and leads directly to the Royal Apartments. Members of the House of Lords use the Peers' Entrance in the middle of the Old Palace Yard façade, which opens to an entrance hall. A staircase from there leads, through a corridor and the Prince's Chamber, to the Lords Chamber. Members of Parliament enter their part of the building from the Members' Entrance on the south side of New Palace Yard. Their route passes through a cloakroom in the lower level of the Cloisters and eventually reaches the Members' Lobby directly south of the Commons Chamber. St Stephen's Entrance, in the approximate centre of the building's western front, is the public entrance. From it, visitors walk through a flight of stairs to St Stephen's Hall, which houses a collection of marble statues of prominent parliamentarians, and then to the Central Lobby.

=== Royal Apartments ===
==== Norman Porch ====
The Sovereign's Entrance is beneath the Victoria Tower. It was designed for the use of the monarch, and is used by them during the State Opening of Parliament. The Sovereign's Entrance is also the formal entrance used by visiting dignitaries, as well as the starting point of public tours of the palace.

From the entrance, a staircase leads up to the principal floor in a broad, unbroken flight of 26 steps made of grey granite. At the top is the Norman Porch, a square landing with a central clustered column and a ceiling of four groin vaults with lierne ribs and carved bosses. The porch was named for its proposed decorative scheme, which was never completed but would have consisted of statues of the Norman kings and frescoes depicting Norman history. As completed, the porch contains stained glass windows depicting Edward the Confessor and a young Queen Victoria, a copy of a 1900 painting of Victoria by Jean-Joseph Benjamin-Constant, and busts of prime ministers who have sat in the House of Lords on the plinths intended for the statues. A double door opposite the stairs leads to the Royal Gallery, and another to the right opens to the Robing Room.

==== Robing Room ====
The Sovereign prepares for the State Opening of Parliament in the Robing Room. Behind is the Chair of State.

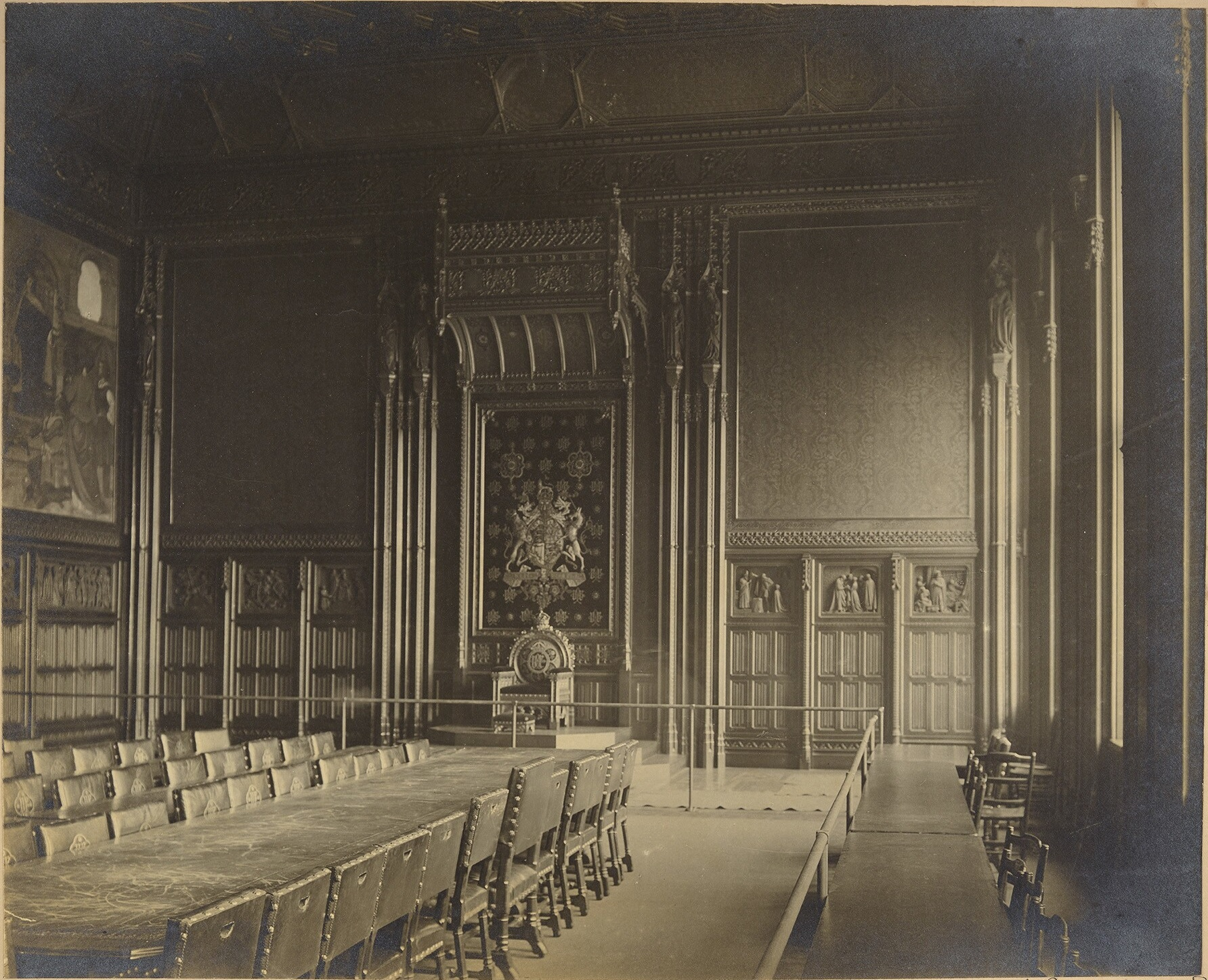
The robing room in 1897

The Robing Room lies at the southern end of the palace's north-south axis, and occupies the centre of the south front, overlooking Victoria Tower Gardens. It is where the Sovereign prepares for the State Opening of Parliament by changing into their official robes and putting on the Imperial State Crown. The focus of the room is the chair of state, which sits on a dais of three steps under a canopy adorned with the arms and floral emblems of England, Scotland and Ireland. A panel of purple velvet forms the backdrop to the chair, embroidered by the Royal School of Needlework with the royal arms, surrounded by stars and VR monograms. Edward Barry designed both the chair—the cushion and back of which are also embroidered—and the ornate marble fireplace across the room, which features gilded statuettes of Saint George and Saint Michael.

The decorative theme of the room is the legend of King Arthur, considered by many Victorians the source of their nationhood. Five frescoes painted by William Dyce between 1848 and 1864 cover the walls, depicting allegorical scenes from the legend. Each scene represents a chivalric virtue; the largest, between the two doors, is titled Admission of Sir Tristram to the Round Table and illustrates the virtue of Hospitality. Seven were originally commissioned but the remaining two paintings were not carried out due to the artist's death, and on the wallpapered panels flanking the Chair of State hang oil portraits of Queen Victoria and Prince Albert by Franz Xaver Winterhalter. (Note: Depicted (clockwise) are the virtues of Courtesy, Religion, Generosity, Hospitality and Mercy. The two missing frescoes were meant to depict Fidelity and Courage. Queen Victoria's portrait can be seen in the Parliamentary website.) Other decorations in the room are also inspired by the Arthurian legend, namely a series of 18 bas-reliefs beneath the paintings, carved in oak by Henry Hugh Armstead, and the frieze running below the ceiling, which displays the attributed coats of arms of the Knights of the Round Table. The ceiling itself is decorated with heraldic badges, as is the border of the wooden floor—which, as can be seen in the adjacent image, is left exposed by the carpeting.

The Robing Room was briefly used as the House of Lords' meeting chamber while the House of Lords Chamber was occupied by the House of Commons, whose chamber had been destroyed by the Blitz in 1941.

==== Royal Gallery ====
Following the rapid decay of Maclise's first two frescoes, the rest of the Royal Gallery's walls were left unpainted.

Immediately north of the Robing Room is the Royal Gallery. At 110 by 45 feet (33.5 by 13.7 m), it is one of the largest rooms in the palace. Its main purpose is to serve as the stage of the royal procession at State Openings of Parliament, which the audience watches from temporary tiered seating on both sides of the route. It has also been used on occasion by visiting statesmen from abroad when addressing both Houses of Parliament, as well as for receptions in honour of foreign dignitaries, and more regularly for the Lord Chancellor's Breakfast; in the past it was the theatre of several trials of peers by the House of Lords. Documents from the Parliamentary Archives are on display in the Royal Gallery (including a facsimile of Charles I's death warrant), and the tables and seating offer a workspace for members of the Lords that is conveniently close to their debating chamber.

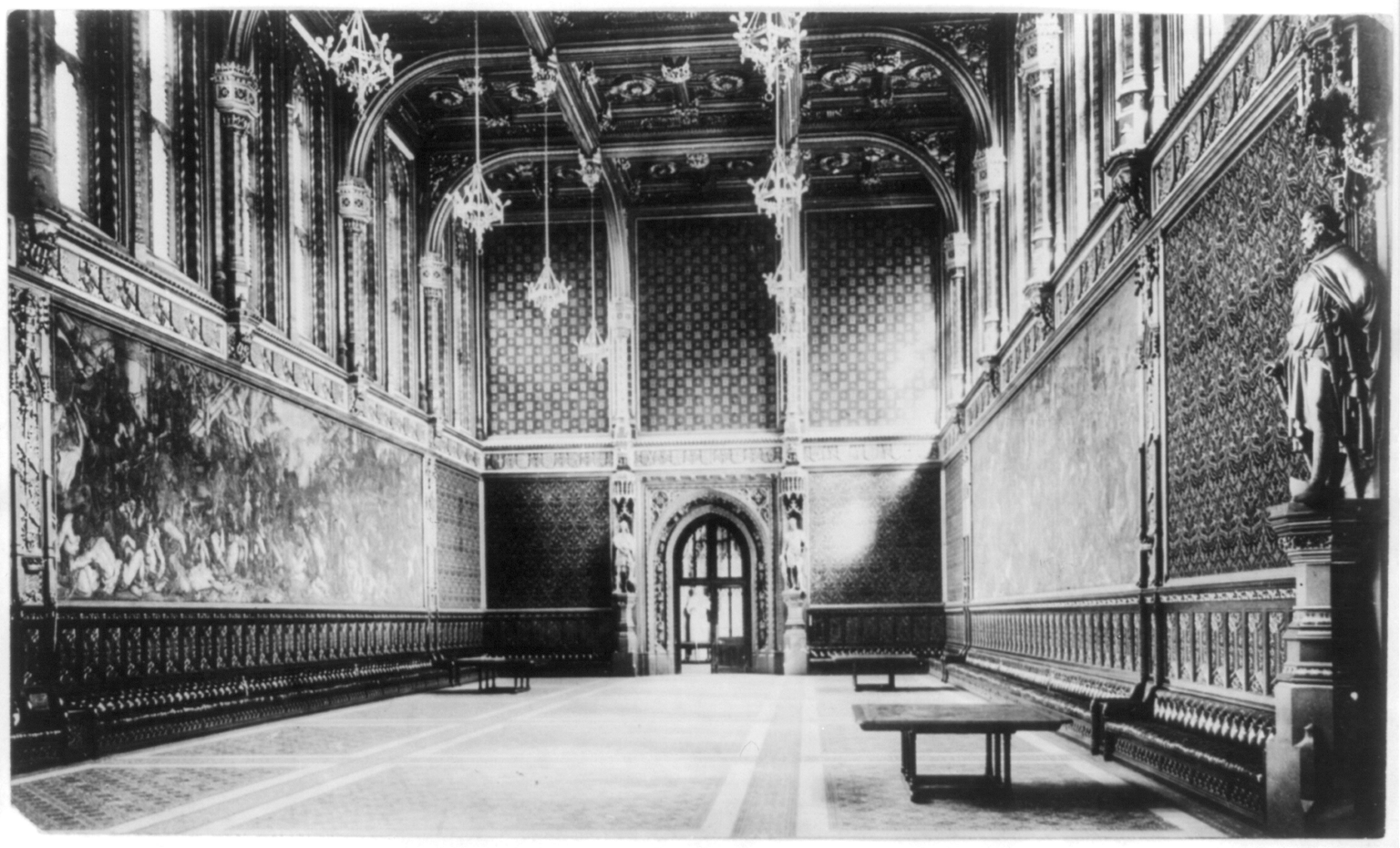
Historical image of the Royal Gallery from the early 1900s

The decorative scheme of the Royal Gallery was meant to display important moments in British military history, and the walls are decorated by two large paintings by Daniel Maclise, each measuring 45 by 12 feet (13.7 by 3.7 m): The Death of Nelson (depicting Lord Nelson's demise at the Battle of Trafalgar in 1805) and The Meeting of Wellington and Blücher after the Battle of Waterloo (showing the Duke of Wellington meeting Gebhard Leberecht von Blücher at the Battle of Waterloo in 1815). The murals deteriorated rapidly after their completion due to a range of factors, most importantly atmospheric pollution, and today they are almost monochrome, although a finished study of The Death of Nelson in better condition hangs in the Walker Art Gallery, Liverpool. The rest of the planned frescos were cancelled, and the walls are filled with portraits of kings and queens from George I onwards. Another decorative element with military undertones are the eight statues of gilded Caen stone that flank the three doorways and the bay window of the Gallery, sculpted by John Birnie Philip. Each depicts a monarch during whose reign a key battle or war took place. They are: Alfred the Great and William the Conqueror; Richard I and Edward III; Henry V and Elizabeth I; William III and Anne. The panelled ceiling, 45 feet (13.7 m) above the floor, features Tudor roses and lions, and the stained-glass windows show the coats of arms of the Kings of England and Scotland.

==== Prince's Chamber ====
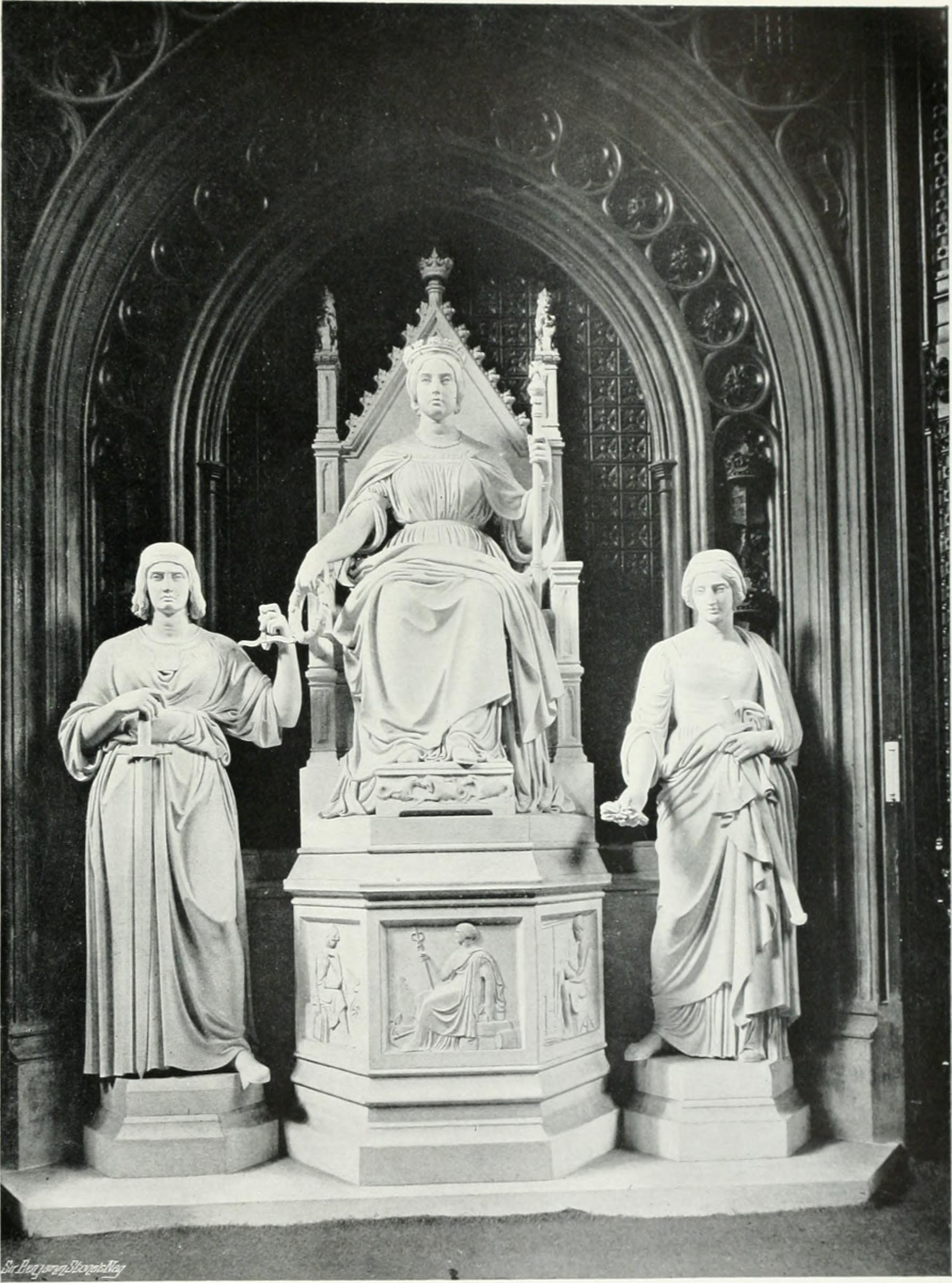
Her Majesty Queen Victoria, Supported by Justice and Clemency, by John Gibson, Prince's Chamber

The Prince's Chamber is a small anteroom between the Royal Gallery and the Lords Chamber, named after the room adjoining the Parliament Chamber in the Old Palace of Westminster. Thanks to its location, it is a place where members of the Lords meet to discuss the business of the House. Several doors lead out of the room, to the division lobbies of the House of Lords and to several important offices.

The theme of the Prince's Chamber is Tudor history, and 28 oil portraits painted on panels around the room depict members of the Tudor dynasty. They are the work of Richard Burchett and his pupils, and their creation entailed extensive research, which contributed to the founding of the National Portrait Gallery in 1856. 12 bronze bas-reliefs are set into the wall below the portraits, executed by William Theed in 1855–1857. Scenes included are The Field of the Cloth of Gold, The Escape of Mary, Queen of Scots and Raleigh Spreading His Cloak As a Carpet for the Queen. Above the portraits, at window level, are copies of six of the ten Armada tapestries, which hung in the chamber of the House of Lords until their destruction in the 1834 fire and depicted the defeat of the Spanish Armada in 1588. The project was put on hold in 1861 (by which time only one painting had been completed), and was not revived until 2007; as of August 2010, all six paintings are now in their intended places.

The room also contains a statue of Queen Victoria, seated on a throne (itself placed on a pedestal) and holding a sceptre and a laurel crown, which show that she both governs and rules. This figure is flanked by allegorical statues of Justice and Clemency, the former with a bare sword and an inflexible expression and the latter showing sympathy and offering an olive branch. The sculptural ensemble, made of white marble and carved by John Gibson in 1855, reaches 8 feet (2.44 m) in height; its size has long been considered out of proportion with the fittings of the Prince's Chamber, and the flanking statues ended up in storage between 1955 and 1976. However, the size and location of the group, in the archway opposite the doors to the Royal Gallery (which are removed before State Openings of Parliament to facilitate the royal procession), indicate that it was meant to be seen from a distance, and to symbolically remind the monarch of their royal duties as they would walk down the Royal Gallery on their way to deliver their speech.

=== Precincts of the House of Lords ===
==== Lords Chamber ====
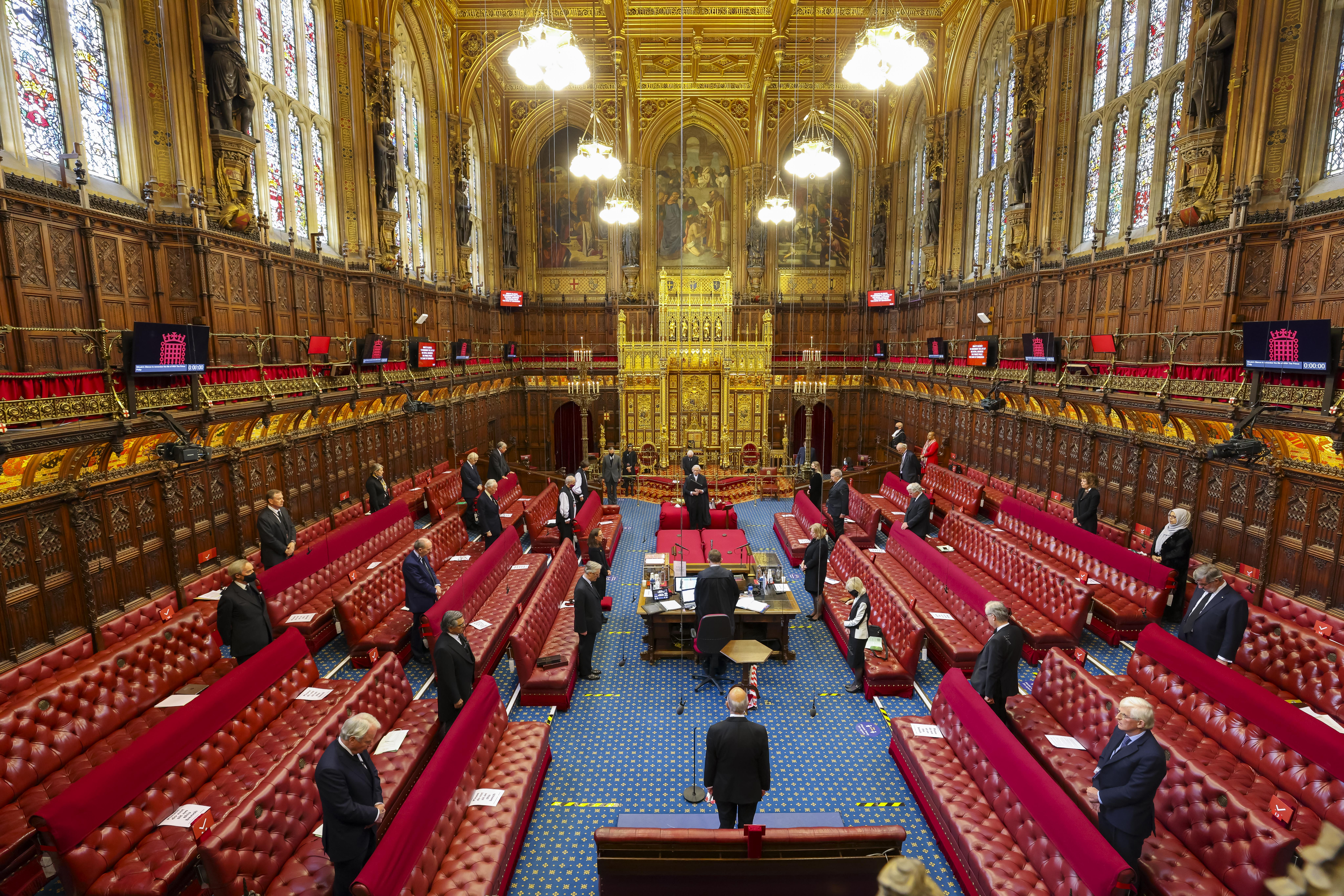
The Sovereign's Throne and its gilded Canopy dominate the ornate Lords Chamber.

The Chamber of the House of Lords is located in the southern part of the Palace of Westminster. The lavishly decorated room measures 45 by 80 feet (13.7 by 24.4 m). The benches in the Chamber, as well as other furnishings in the Lords' side of the palace, are coloured red. The upper part of the Chamber is decorated by stained glass windows and by six allegorical frescoes representing religion, chivalry and law.

At the south end of the Chamber are the ornate gold Canopy and Throne. However, the Sovereign may theoretically occupy the Throne during any sitting; he or she attends only the State Opening of Parliament. Other members of the Royal Family who attend the State Opening use Chairs of State next to the Throne, and peers' sons are always entitled to sit on the steps of the Throne. In front of the Throne is the Woolsack, an armless red cushion stuffed with wool, representing the historical importance of the wool trade, and used by the officer presiding over the House (the Lord Speaker since 2006, but historically the Lord Chancellor or a deputy). The House's mace, which represents royal authority, is placed on the back of the Woolsack. In front of the Woolsack is the Judges' Woolsack, a larger red cushion that used to be occupied during the State Opening by the Law Lords (who were members of the House of Lords), and prospectively by the Supreme Court Justices and other Judges (whether or not members), to represent the Judicial Branch of Government. The Table of the House, at which the clerks sit, is in front.

Members of the House occupy red benches on three sides of the Chamber. The benches on the Lord Speaker's right form the Spiritual Side and those to his left form the Temporal Side. The Lords Spiritual (archbishops and bishops of the established Church of England) all occupy the Spiritual Side. The Lords Temporal (nobles) sit according to party affiliation: members of the Government party sit on the Spiritual Side, while those of the Opposition sit on the Temporal Side. Some peers, who have no party affiliation, sit on the benches in the middle of the House opposite the Woolsack; they are accordingly known as crossbenchers.

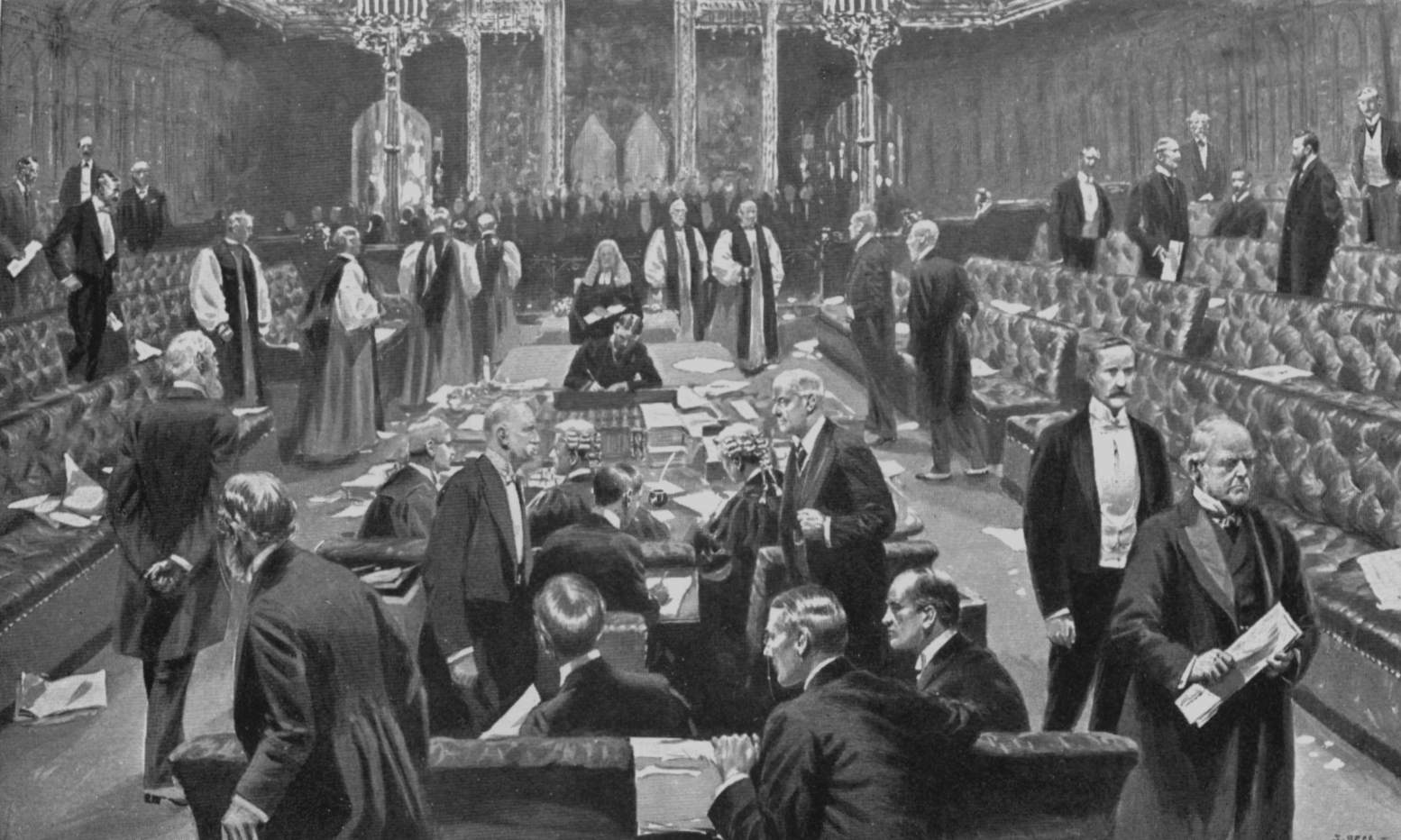
The passage of the Parliament Act 1911. Votes in both Houses of Parliament are conducted in the form of divisions.

The Lords Chamber is the site of nationally televised ceremonies, the most important of which is the State Opening of Parliament, which is held formally to open each annual parliamentary session, either after a General Election or in the autumn. At this occasion every constitutional element of the government is represented: the Crown (both literally, and figuratively in the person of the Sovereign), The Lords Spiritual and Temporal, and The Commons, (who together form the Legislature), the Judiciary (although no judges are members of either House of Parliament), and the Executive (both Government Ministers, and ceremonial military units in attendance on the Sovereign); and a large number of guests are invited to attend in the large Royal Gallery immediately outside the Chamber. The Sovereign, seated on the Throne, delivers the Speech from the Throne, outlining the Government's programme for the year and legislative agenda for the forthcoming parliamentary session. The Commons may not enter the Lords' debating floor; instead, they watch the proceedings from beyond the Bar of the House, just inside the door. A small purely formal ceremony is held to end each parliamentary session, when the Sovereign is merely represented by a group of Lords Commissioners.

Following the Blitz, which destroyed the chamber of the House of Commons, the Lords' chamber was occupied by the Commons. The Lords temporarily used the Robing Room during the reconstruction. The State Opening Of Parliament was carried out as normal, with the new rooms being used. Evidence can still be seen of this today, with damage clearly visible on one of the doors where they were struck by Black Rod.

==== Peers' Lobby ====
Directly north of the Lords Chamber lies the Peers' Lobby, an antechamber where Lords can informally discuss or negotiate matters during sittings of the House, as well as collect messages from the doorkeepers, who control access to the Chamber. The Lobby is a square room measuring 39 feet (12 m) on each side and 33 feet (10 m) in height, and one of its main features is the floor centrepiece, a radiant Tudor rose made of Derbyshire marbles and set within an octagon of engraved brass plates. The rest of the floor is paved with encaustic tiles featuring heraldic designs and Latin mottoes. The walls are faced with white stone and each is pierced by a doorway; above the arches are displayed arms representing the six royal dynasties which ruled England until Queen Victoria's reign (Saxon, Norman, Plantagenet, Tudor, Stuart and Hanoverian). Between them, there are windows stained with the arms of the early aristocratic families of England.

Of the doorways, the one to the south—which leads into the Lords' Chamber—is the most magnificent, sporting much gilding and decoration, including the full royal arms. The Brass Gates enclose it, a pair of elaborately pierced and studded doors together weighing 1.5 tonnes. The side doors, which feature clocks, open into corridors: to the east extends the Law Lords Corridor, which leads to the libraries, and nearby to the west lies the Moses Room, used for Grand Committees.

To the north is the vaulted Peers' Corridor, which is decorated with eight murals by Charles West Cope depicting historical scenes from the period around the English Civil War. The frescoes were executed between 1856 and 1866, and each scene was "specifically chosen to depict the struggles through which national liberties were won". Examples include Speaker Lenthall Asserting the Privileges of the Commons Against Charles I when the Attempt was Made to Seize the Five Members, representing resistance against absolute rule, and The Embarkation of the Pilgrim Fathers for New England, which illustrates the principle of freedom of worship.

=== Central Lobby ===
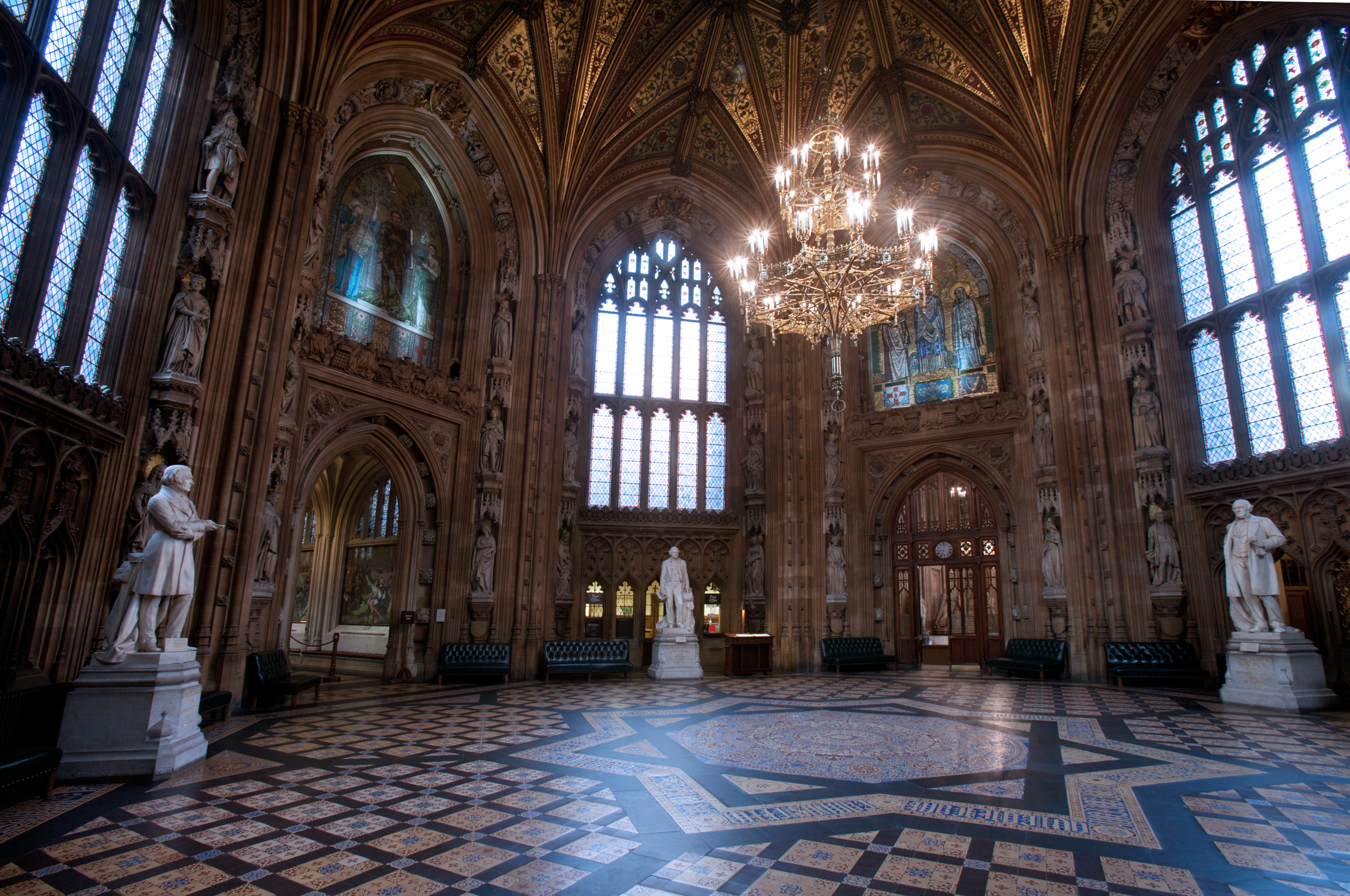
Saint George for England by Sir Edward Poynter and Saint Patrick for Ireland by Robert Anning Bell are two of the four mosaics decorating the Central Lobby.

Originally named "Octagon Hall" because of its shape, the Central Lobby is the heart of the Palace of Westminster. It lies directly below the Central Tower and forms a busy crossroads between the House of Lords to the south, the House of Commons to the north, St Stephen's Hall and the public entrance to the west, and the Lower Waiting Hall and the libraries to the east. Its location halfway between the two debating chambers has led constitutional theorist Erskine May to describe the Lobby as "the political centre of the British Empire", and allows a person standing under the great chandelier to see both the Royal Throne and the Speaker's Chair, provided that all the intervening doors are open. Constituents may meet their members of parliament here, even without an appointment, and this practice is the origin of the term lobbying. The hall is also the theatre of the Speaker's Procession, which passes from here on its way to the Commons Chamber before every sitting of the House.

The Central Lobby measures 59 feet (18 m) across and 75 feet (23 m) from the floor to the centre of the vaulted ceiling. The panels between the vault's ribs are covered with Venetian glass mosaic displaying floral emblems and heraldic badges, and the bosses in the intersections of the ribs are also carved into heraldic symbols. Each wall of the Lobby is contained in an arch ornamented with statues of English and Scottish monarchs; on four sides there are doorways, and the tympana above them are adorned with mosaics representing the patron saints of the United Kingdom's constituent nations: Saint George for England, Saint Andrew for Scotland, Saint David for Wales and Saint Patrick for Ireland. (Note: The United Kingdom of Great Britain and Ireland included all of Ireland until the Irish Free State's creation in 1922. Decorative references to Ireland exist throughout the Palace of Westminster and include symbols like the Irish harp and the shamrock. The saints' mosaics were planned from 1847, but Robert Anning Bell's design for Ireland was completed in 1924 and reflects the 1920–22 partition, with Saint Patrick flanked by Saint Columba over the arms of Ulster for Northern Ireland, and Saint Brigid over the arms of Ireland for the Free State.) The other four arches are occupied by high windows, under which there are stone screens—the hall's post office, one of two in the palace, is located behind one of these screens. In front of them stand four bigger-than-life statues of 19th-century statesmen, including one of four-time prime minister William Gladstone. The floor on which they stand is tiled with Minton encaustic tiles in intricate patterns and includes a passage from Psalm 127 written in Latin, which translates as follows: "Except the Lord build the House their labour is but lost that build it".

The East Corridor leads from the Central Lobby to the Lower Waiting Hall, and its six panels remained blank until 1910, when they were filled with scenes from Tudor history. They were all paid for by Liberal peers and each was the work of a different artist, but uniformity was achieved between the frescoes thanks to a common colour palette of red, black and gold and a uniform height for the depicted characters. One of the scenes is probably not historical: Plucking the Red and White Roses in the Old Temple Gardens, depicting the origin of these flowers as emblems of the Houses of Lancaster and York respectively, was taken from Shakespeare's play Henry VI, Part 1.

=== Precincts of the House of Commons ===
==== Members' Lobby ====
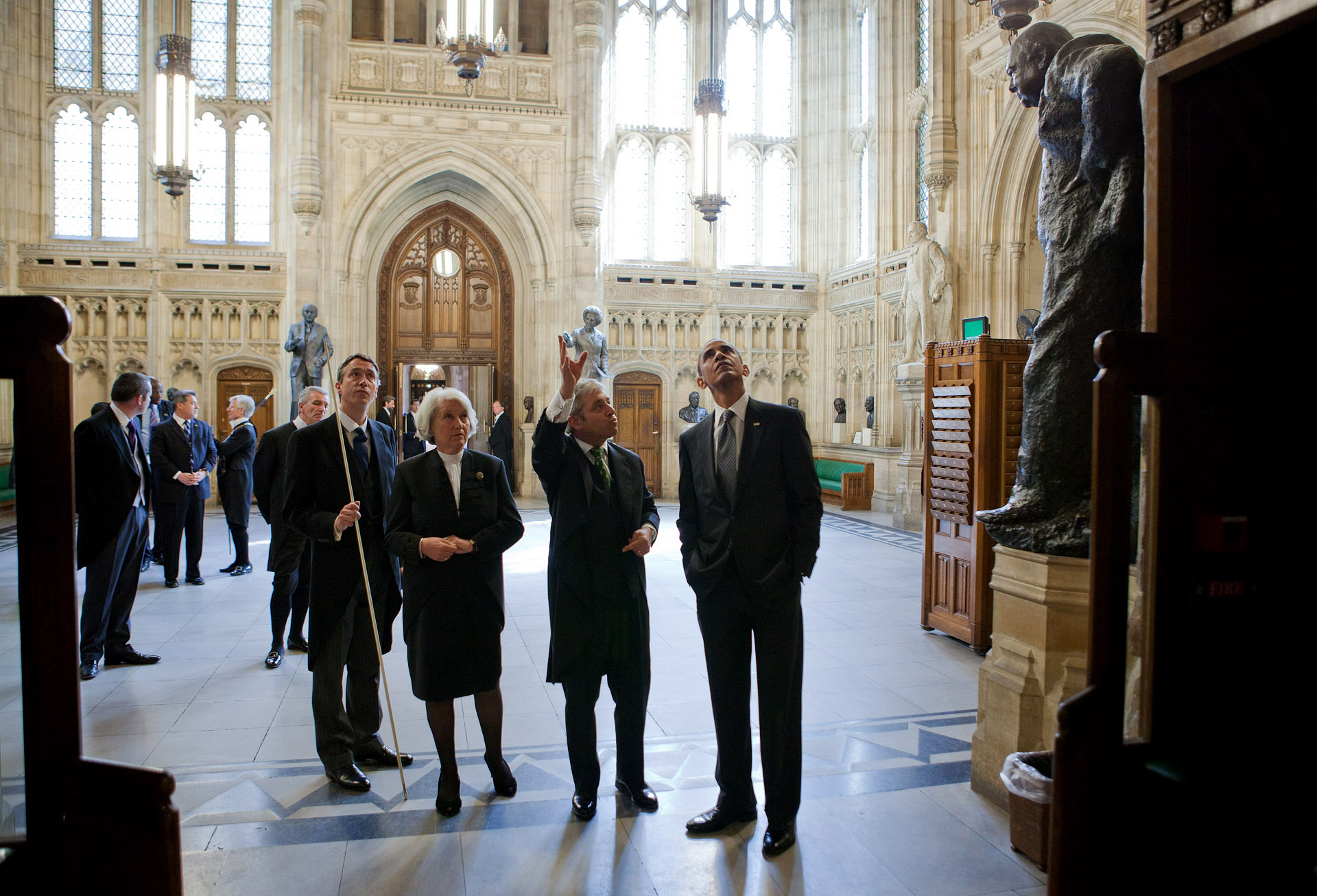
US President Barack Obama (right) in the Members' Lobby during a tour of the Palace in May 2011. With him are, from the left: the Lord Great Chamberlain, the Marquess of Cholmondeley, holding his white staff of office; the Lord Speaker, Baroness Hayman; and the Speaker of the House of Commons, John Bercow.

Continuing north from the Central Lobby is the Commons' Corridor. It is of almost identical design to its southern counterpart and is decorated with scenes of 17th-century political history between the Civil War and the Revolution of 1688. They were painted by Edward Matthew Ward and include subjects like Monk Declaring for a Free Parliament and The Lords and Commons Presenting the Crown to William III and Mary II in the Banqueting Hall. Then, mirroring the arrangement at the Lords part of the palace, is another antechamber, the Members' Lobby. In this room, Members of Parliament hold discussions or negotiations, and are often interviewed by accredited journalists, collectively known as "The Lobby".

The room is similar to the Peers' Lobby but plainer in design and slightly larger, forming a cube 45 feet (13.7 m) on all sides. After the heavy damage it sustained in the 1941 bombing, it was rebuilt in a simplified style, something most evident in the floor, which is almost completely unadorned. The archway of the door leading into the Commons Chamber has been left unrepaired as a reminder of the evils of war, and is now known as the Rubble Arch or Churchill Arch. It is flanked by bronze statues of Winston Churchill and David Lloyd George, the prime ministers who led Britain through the Second and First World War respectively; a foot of each is conspicuously shiny, a result of a long tradition of MPs rubbing them for good luck on their way in before their maiden speech. The Lobby contains the busts and statues of most 20th-century prime ministers, as well as two large boards where MPs can receive letters and telephone messages, which were designed for the House's use and installed in the early 1960s.

==== Commons Chamber ====
The Chamber of the House of Commons is at the northern end of the Palace of Westminster; it was opened in 1950 after the Victorian chamber had been destroyed in 1941 and rebuilt under the architect Giles Gilbert Scott. The Chamber measures 46 by 68 feet (14 by 20.7 m) and is plainer in style than the Lords Chamber; the benches, as well as other furnishings in the Commons side of the palace, are coloured green. Members of the public are forbidden to sit on the benches. Other parliaments in Commonwealth nations, including those of India, Canada, Australia and New Zealand, have copied the colour scheme under which the Lower House is associated with green, and the Upper House with red.

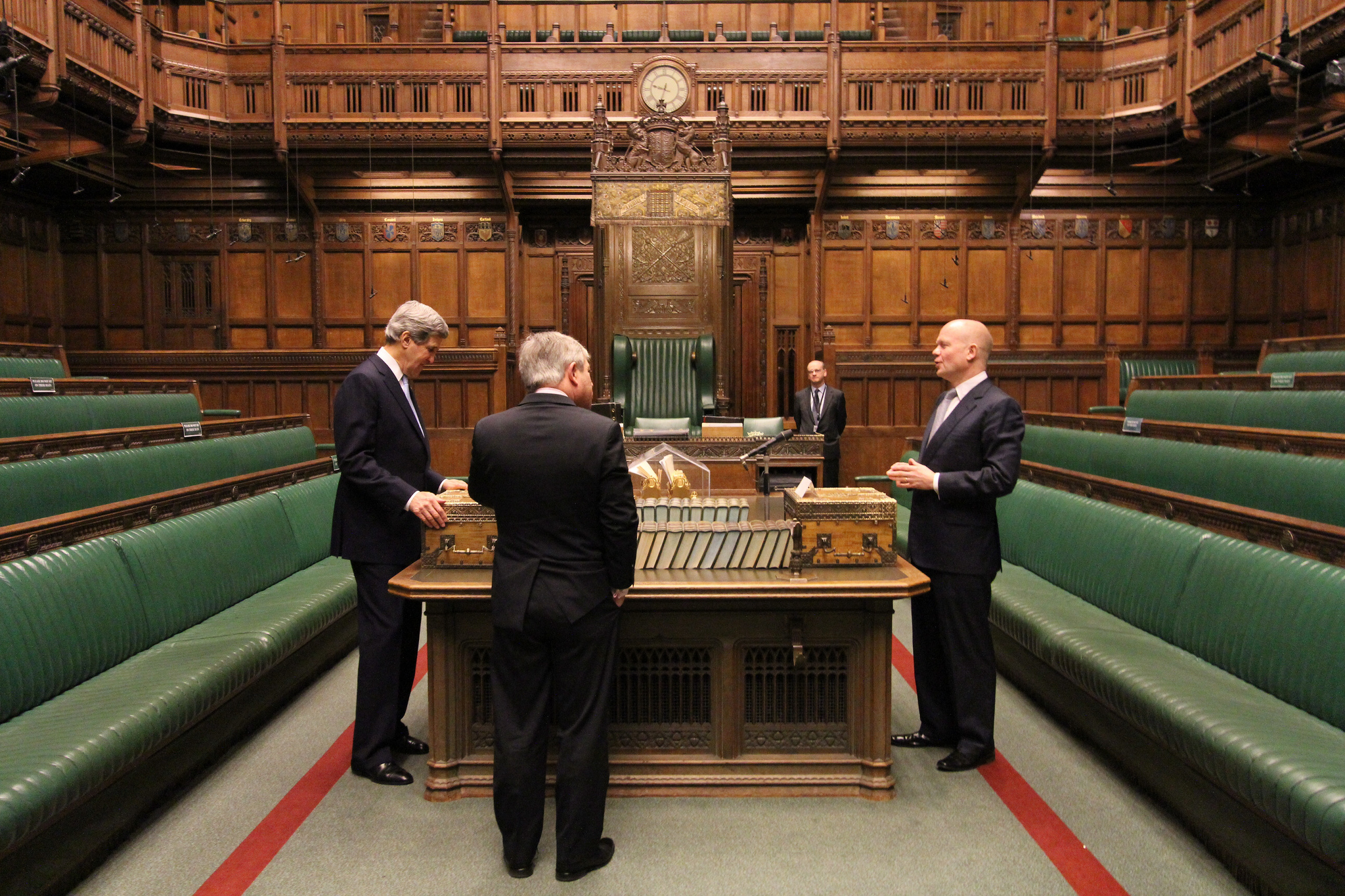
Left to right: US Secretary of State John Kerry, House of Commons Speaker John Bercow and Foreign Secretary William Hague examine the despatch boxes on 25 February 2013.

At the north end of the Chamber is the Speaker's Chair, a present to Parliament from Australia. The current British Speaker's Chair is an exact copy of the Speaker's Chair given to Australia (itself a copy of the original chair) by the United Kingdom Branch of the Empire Parliamentary Association, to celebrate the opening of Provisional Parliament House, Canberra. In front of the Speaker's Chair is the Table of the House, at which the clerks sit, and on which is placed the Commons' ceremonial mace. The Table was a gift from Canada. The dispatch boxes, which front-bench Members of Parliament (MPs) often lean on or rest notes on during Questions and speeches, are a gift from New Zealand. There are green benches on either side of the House; members of the Government party occupy benches on the Speaker's right, while those of the Opposition occupy benches on the Speaker's left. There are no cross-benches as in the House of Lords. The Chamber is relatively small, and can accommodate only 427 of the 650 members of parliament—during Prime Minister's Questions and in major debates MPs stand at either end of the House.

By tradition, the British Sovereign does not enter the Chamber of the House of Commons. The last monarch to do so was King Charles I, in 1642. The King sought to arrest five members of parliament on charges of high treason, but when he asked the Speaker, William Lenthall, if he had any knowledge of the whereabouts of these individuals, Lenthall famously replied: "May it please your Majesty, I have neither eyes to see nor tongue to speak in this place but as the House is pleased to direct me, whose servant I am here." Since then, in the State Opening of Parliament, when Black Rod representing the monarch approaches the doors to the chamber of the House of Commons to make the summons, the doors are pointedly slammed in his or her face. Black Rod has to strike the door three times with a staff to be admitted and issue the summons from the monarch to the MPs to attend. When repairs after the Second World War bombing were completed, the rebuilt chamber was opened by King George VI on 26 October 1950, who was invited to an "unofficial" tour of the new structure by Commons leaders.

The two red lines on the floor of the House of Commons are 8 feet 2 inches (2.5 m) apart, which, by apocryphal tradition, is intended to be just over two sword-lengths. It is said that the original purpose of this was to prevent disputes in the House from degenerating into duels. However, there is no record of a time when members of parliament were allowed to bring swords into the Chamber; historically only the Serjeant at Arms has been allowed to carry a sword as a symbol of their role in Parliament, plus Black Rod when summoning the Commons to the Lords, and there are loops of pink ribbon in the Members' cloakroom for MPs to hang up their swords before entering the Chamber. In the days when gentlemen carried swords, there were no lines in the Chamber. Protocol dictates that MPs may not cross these lines when speaking; opposition Members will lambaste a member of parliament who violates this convention.

== Westminster Hall ==
Westminster Hall in the early 19th century, surmounted by its medieval hammerbeam roof

Westminster Hall is a large medieval great hall and the oldest surviving palace building. It was erected in 1097 for William II ("William Rufus"), at which point it was the largest hall in Europe. The building has had various functions over the years, including being used for judicial purposes from the twelfth to the nineteenth centuries. When a joint address is given to the two chambers of the UK Parliament, the House of Commons and House of Lords, the hall is on rare occasions the venue. It was also used to host coronation banquets until the nineteenth century, and since the twentieth century has been the usual venue for the lyings in state of state and ceremonial funerals.

The hall is particularly notable for its hammerbeam roof, a form typical of English Gothic architecture which uses horizontal trusses to span large distances; the hall originally had three aisles. The roof was commissioned for Richard II in 1393 and built by the royal carpenter, Hugh Herland. It is the largest clearspan medieval roof in England, measuring 20.7 by 73.2 metres (68 by 240 ft). The oak timbers came from woods in South-East England and were assembled near Farnham, Surrey, 35 miles (56 km) away from Westminster. At the same time, the rest of the hall was remodelled by the master mason Henry Yevele, who refaced the walls and added fifteen life-size statues of kings placed in niches. The renovations include eighty-three unique depictions of Richard's favourite heraldic badge, a resting chained White Hart.

== Other rooms ==
There are two suites of libraries on the Principal Floor, overlooking the river, for the House of Lords Library and House of Commons Library.

The Palace of Westminster also includes state apartments for the presiding officers of the two Houses. The official residence of the Speaker stands at the northern end of the palace; the Lord Chancellor's apartments are at the southern end. Each day, the Speaker and Lord Speaker take part in formal processions from their apartments to their respective Chambers.

The Strangers' Bar is one of the numerous bars, cafeterias and restaurants in the Palace of Westminster, with differing rules regarding who is allowed to use their facilities; many of them never close while the House is sitting. There is also a gymnasium, a hair salon; and there was a rifle range (which closed in 2015). Parliament also has two souvenir shops, where items on sale range from House of Commons key-rings and china to House of Commons Champagne.

== Security ==
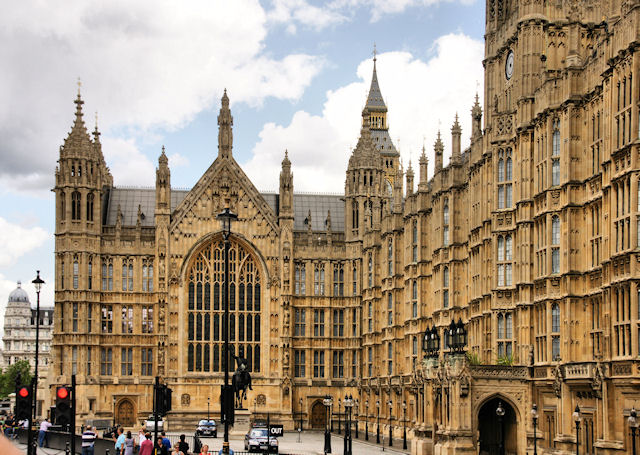
Concrete barriers restrict access to Old Palace Yard.

An official known as Black Rod (officially the Gentleman Usher of the Black Rod, or Lady Usher of the Black Rod) oversees security for the House of Lords, while the Serjeant at Arms does the same for the House of Commons. These officers, however, have primarily ceremonial roles outside the actual chambers of their respective Houses. Security is the responsibility of the Parliamentary Security Director. Parliament has its own professional security force. Tradition still dictates that only the Serjeant at Arms may enter the Commons chamber armed.

With rising concern about the possibility that a vehicle full of explosives could be driven into the building, a series of concrete blocks was placed in the roadway in 2003. On the river, an exclusion zone extending 70 metres (77 yd) from the bank exists, where no unauthorised vessels are allowed to enter.

The Serious Organised Crime and Police Act 2005 formerly made it illegal to hold a protest near the palace, or anywhere else within a designated area extending up to 1 kilometre (0.6 mi) from Parliament Square, without authorisation from the Metropolitan Police. The Act also restricted the operation of loudspeakers in the designated area. These provisions were repealed by the Police Reform and Social Responsibility Act 2011, which replaced them with a total ban on tents and sleeping bags in Parliament Square, as well as a prohibition on the use of loudspeakers in the Square without permission from the relevant local authority.

Members of the public continue to have access to the Strangers' Gallery in the House of Commons. Visitors pass through metal detectors and their possessions are scanned. Police from the Palace of Westminster Division of the Metropolitan Police, supported by some armed police from the Diplomatic Protection Group, are always on duty in and around the palace.

=== Incidents ===
The failed Gunpowder Plot of 1605 was a conspiracy among a group of Roman Catholic gentry to re-establish Catholicism in England by assassinating the Protestant King James I and replacing him with a Catholic monarch. To this end, they placed large quantities of gunpowder beneath the House of Lords, which one of the conspirators, Guy Fawkes, would detonate during the State Opening of Parliament on 5 November 1605. If successful, the explosion would have destroyed the palace, killing the King, his family and most of the aristocracy. However, the plot was discovered and most of the conspirators were either arrested or killed while trying to evade capture. The survivors were tortured in the Tower of London, tried for high treason in Westminster Hall, convicted and gruesomely executed by hanging, drawing and quartering. Since then, the cellars of the palace have been searched by the Yeomen of the Guard before every State Opening of Parliament, a traditional precaution against any similar attempts against the Sovereign.

The execution of Sir Walter Raleigh occurred at the palace of Westminster on 29 October 1618.

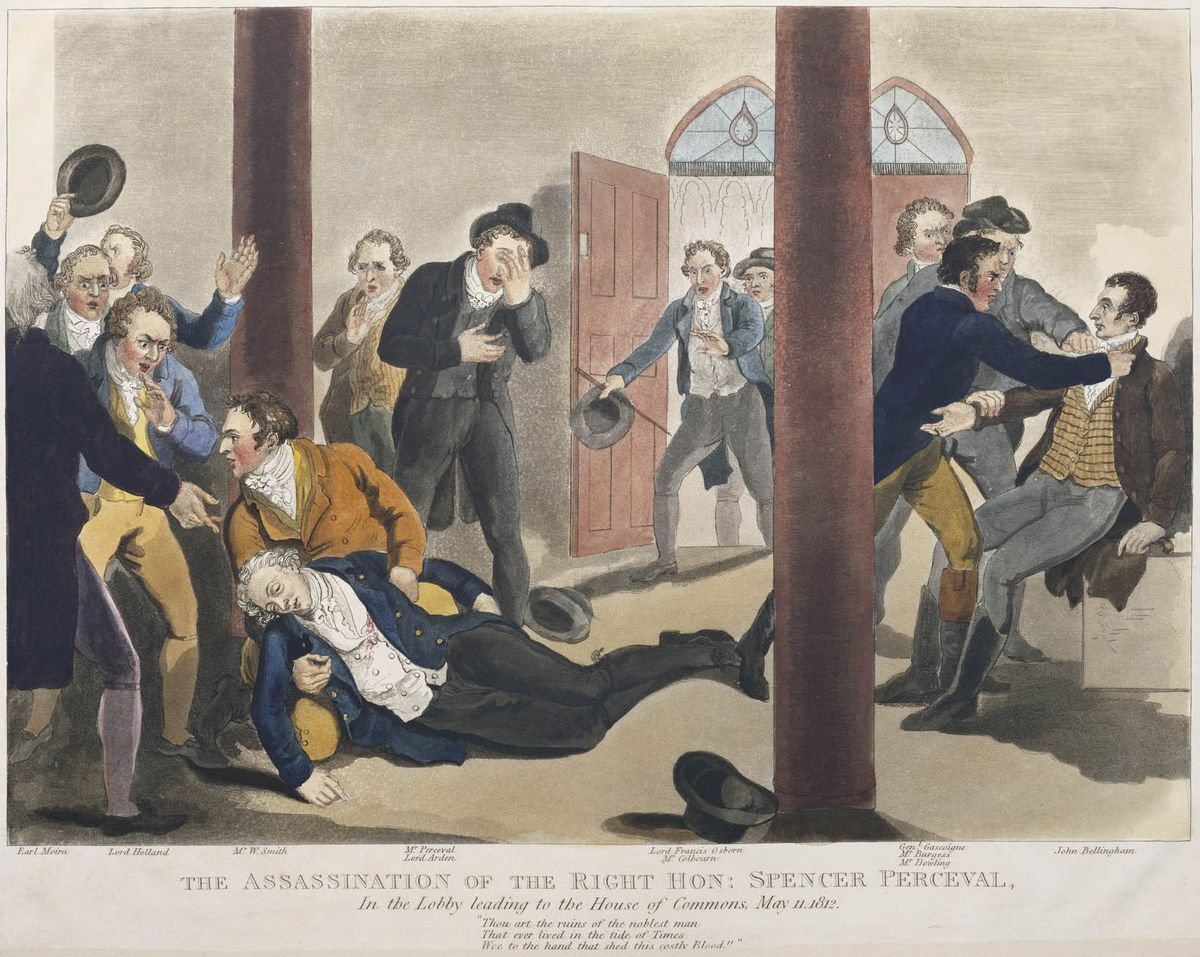
The assassination of Prime Minister Spencer Perceval in 1812 in the lobby of the House of Commons

The previous Palace of Westminster was also the site of a prime-ministerial assassination on 11 May 1812. While in the lobby of the House of Commons, on his way to a parliamentary inquiry, Spencer Perceval was shot and killed by a Liverpool merchant adventurer, John Bellingham. Perceval remains the only British Prime Minister to have been assassinated.

The New Palace became the target of Fenian bombs on 24 January 1885, along with the Tower of London. The first bomb, a black bag containing dynamite, was discovered by a visitor on the steps towards the Chapel of St Mary Undercroft. Police Constable (PC) William Cole attempted to carry it to New Palace Yard, but the bag became so hot that Cole dropped it and it exploded. The blast opened a crater in the floor 1 metre (3 ft) in diameter, damaged the roof of the chapel and shattered all the windows in the Hall, including the stained-glass South Window at St Stephen's Porch. Both Cole and PC Cox, a colleague who had joined him to offer assistance, were seriously injured. A second explosion followed almost immediately in the Commons Chamber, causing great damage—especially to its south end—but no injuries, as it was empty at the time. The incident resulted in the closure of Westminster Hall to visitors for several years; when visitors were re-admitted in 1889, it was under certain restrictions and never while the two Houses were sitting.

On 17 June 1974, a 9-kilogram (20 lb) bomb planted by the Provisional IRA exploded in Westminster Hall. The explosion and the resulting fire, which was fed by a ruptured gas main, injured 11 people and caused extensive damage. Five years later, a car bomb claimed the life of Airey Neave, a prominent Conservative politician, while he was driving out of the Commons car park in New Palace Yard. The attack occurred on 30 March 1979, one day after the announcement of that year's general election; both the Irish National Liberation Army and the Provisional IRA claimed responsibility for Neave's assassination, but it is now accepted that the former were responsible.

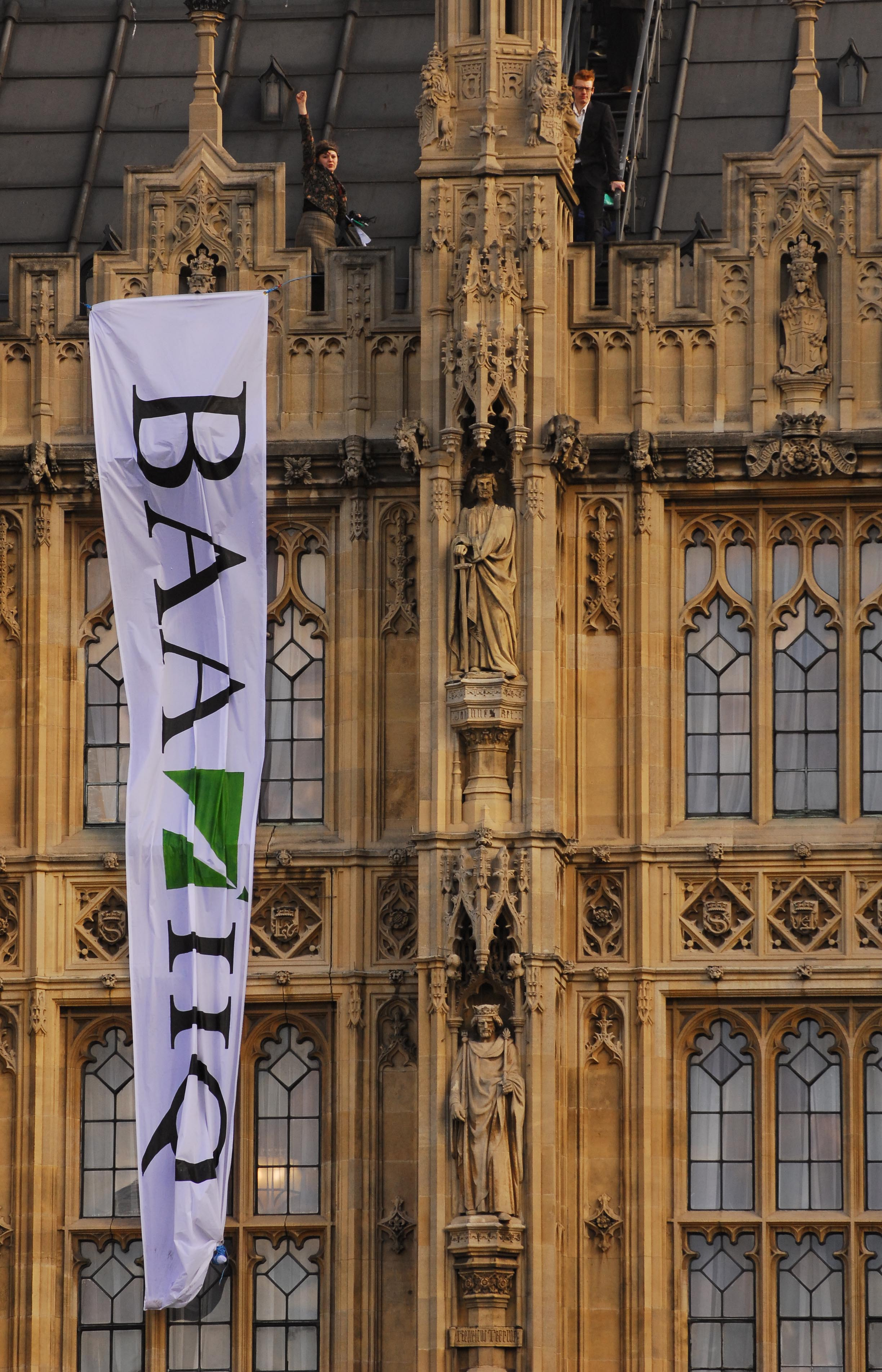
Plane Stupid activists on the roof of the Palace of Westminster

The palace has also been the scene of numerous acts of politically motivated "direct action", which often took place in the Chamber of the House of Commons. In July 1970, a man in the Strangers' Gallery threw two canisters of tear gas into the Chamber to protest against the use of such gas in Northern Ireland; an MP and two members of the House's staff were taken to hospital, and the sitting was suspended for almost two hours. In 1978, activist Yana Mintoff and another dissident threw bags of horse manure, and in June 1996 demonstrators dropped leaflets. (Note: The Member for the Isle of Wight, Barry Field, subsequently commented that he was "showered by national lottery tickets" and asked the Speaker "whether they came from that long lottery finger in the advertisement that points down to people and says, 'It could be you' ".) Concern about such attacks and a possible chemical or biological attack led to the installation of a glass screen across the Strangers' Gallery in early 2004.

The new barrier does not cover the gallery in front of the Strangers' Gallery, which is reserved for ambassadors, members of the House of Lords, guests of MPs and other dignitaries, and in May 2004 protesters from Fathers 4 Justice attacked Prime Minister Tony Blair with flour bombs from this part, after obtaining admission by bidding for a place in the visitors' gallery in a charity auction. Subsequently, rules on admission to the visitors' galleries were changed, and now individuals wishing to sit in the galleries must first obtain a written pass from a Member certifying that that individual is personally known to them. In September of the same year, five protesters opposed to the proposed ban on fox hunting disrupted the proceedings of the House of Commons by running into the Chamber, the first such occurrence since King Charles I's unauthorised entry in 1642, which triggered the English Civil War.

Protesters have also targeted the House of Lords. On 2 February 1988, the House debated the Local Government Bill's controversial Clause 28, a measure to prohibit the promotion of homosexuality in schools. Following the division, in which the clause passed, several lesbian demonstrators in the public gallery started chanting slogans, and three of them tied ropes to the railing and climbed down onto the floor of the Chamber. Lord Monkswell, who had provided the women with passes to attend the debate, later apologised to the House for the incident but did not criticise the protest.

Similar actions have been carried out outside the Palace of Westminster. Early in the morning of 20 March 2004, two Greenpeace members scaled the Clock Tower to demonstrate against the Iraq War, raising questions about the security around such a likely target of terrorist attacks. In March 2007, another four members of Greenpeace made their way to the palace's roof by means of a nearby crane, which was being used for repairs to Westminster Bridge. Once up, they unfurled a 15-metre (50 ft) banner protesting against the British government's plans to update the Trident nuclear programme.

In February 2008, five campaigners from the Plane Stupid group gained admittance to the building as visitors and then moved up to the roof to demonstrate against the proposed expansion of Heathrow Airport; from there they hung two banners they had smuggled past security. MPs and security experts found it worrying that the protesters made it to the roof in spite of the heightened security measures, and the prosecution at the activists' trial argued that they may have received help from a House of Lords employee. In October 2009, at least forty Greenpeace activists climbed to the roof of Westminster Hall to call for the adoption of policies combating climate change. Some of them climbed down after nearly five hours, while the rest spent the night on the roof. (Note: Sources differ on the exact number of demonstrators. A House of Commons spokeswoman stated that 45 people climbed to the roof, and a Metropolitan Police spokeswoman said that 20 climbed down on the first day, but 31 activists stayed there overnight according to Greenpeace, and the BBC later reported that 54 people were charged with "trespassing on land designated a protected site".)

On 22 March 2017, an Islamist-related terror attack was carried out in which a man stabbed a police officer after ploughing into pedestrians on Westminster Bridge. Five people were killed, including the attacker and the police officer. In August 2018 there was another attack, treated by prosecutors as terrorism.

On 1 April 2019, a group of environmental protestors from the group Extinction Rebellion stripped semi-naked in the public gallery during a Brexit debate and glued themselves to the handrail and glass screen with their buttocks facing the Commons Chamber. MPs attempted to continue the debate, some of them incorporating puns and references to nakedness into their speeches, to much hilarity.

There have been four fires on the Palace of Westminster site during 2019, and eight in 2018.

In 2022, the body of the late Queen Elizabeth was left inside the hall for people to pay their respects. A man decided to jump the barriers and pull away the flag draped over the coffin. He was detained and taken away by the police and officials.

== Rules and traditions ==
The palace has accumulated many rules and traditions over the centuries.

=== Eating, drinking and smoking ===
Smoking has not been allowed in the chamber of the House of Commons since the 17th century. As a result, Members may take snuff instead and the doorkeepers still keep a snuff-box for this purpose. Despite persistent media rumours, it has not been permitted to smoke anywhere inside the palace since 2005. Members may not eat or drink in the chamber; the exception to this rule is the Chancellor of the Exchequer, who may have a beverage of the Chancellors' choice while delivering the Budget statement. Traditionally, this is an alcoholic beverage, often whisky or a similar spirit, but in recent times, Chancellors have opted for water.

=== Dress code ===
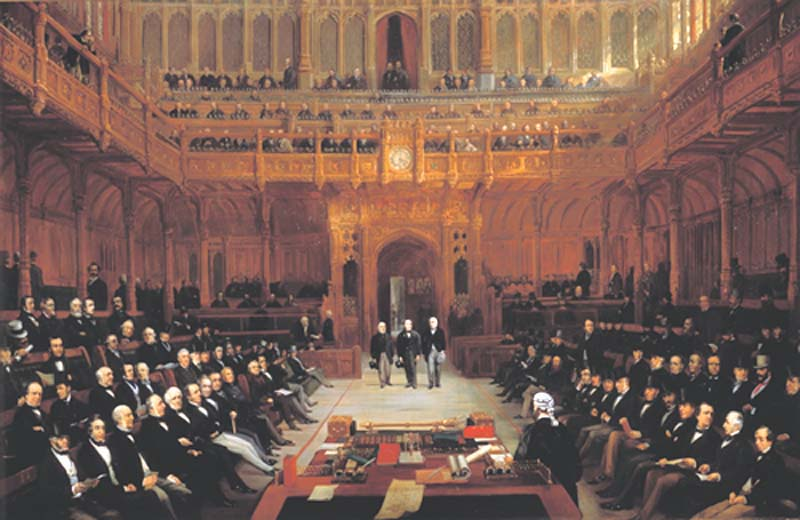
The introduction of a new Member of Parliament, 1858. Wearing hats in the House of Commons has not always been treated in the same way.

Men are expected to wear formal attire, women are expected to dress in business-like clothing and the wearing of T-shirts with slogans is not allowed. Hats must not be worn (although they used to be worn when a point of order was being raised), and members may not wear military decorations or insignia. Members are not allowed to have their hands in their pockets—Andrew Robathan was heckled by opposing MPs for doing this on 19 December 1994.

=== Other traditions ===
The only animals allowed in the Palace of Westminster are guide dogs, police dogs and police horses.

Speeches may not be read out during debate in the House of Commons, although notes may be referred to. Similarly, the reading of newspapers is not allowed. Visual aids are discouraged in the chamber. Applause is also not normally allowed in the Commons, but it has since been tolerated in certain cases. Some notable exceptions to this were when Robin Cook gave his resignation speech in 2003; when Prime Minister Tony Blair appeared for the last time at Prime Minister's Questions; when Speaker Michael Martin gave his leaving speech on 17 June 2009; and after the resignation statement of Sir Robert Rogers, Clerk of the House. At the start of the new parliament in May 2015, the large influx of new Scottish National Party MPs flouted the convention and repeatedly applauded their party leader, to the displeasure of the Speaker.

The status of the building as a royal palace raises legal questions—according to Halsbury's Laws of England, it is not possible to arrest a person within the "verges" of the palace (the palace itself and its immediate surroundings). However, according to a memorandum by the Clerk of the House of Commons, there is no prohibition on arrest within the palace and such arrests have been effected in the past.

== Culture and tourism ==
Claude Monet's Houses of Parliament series

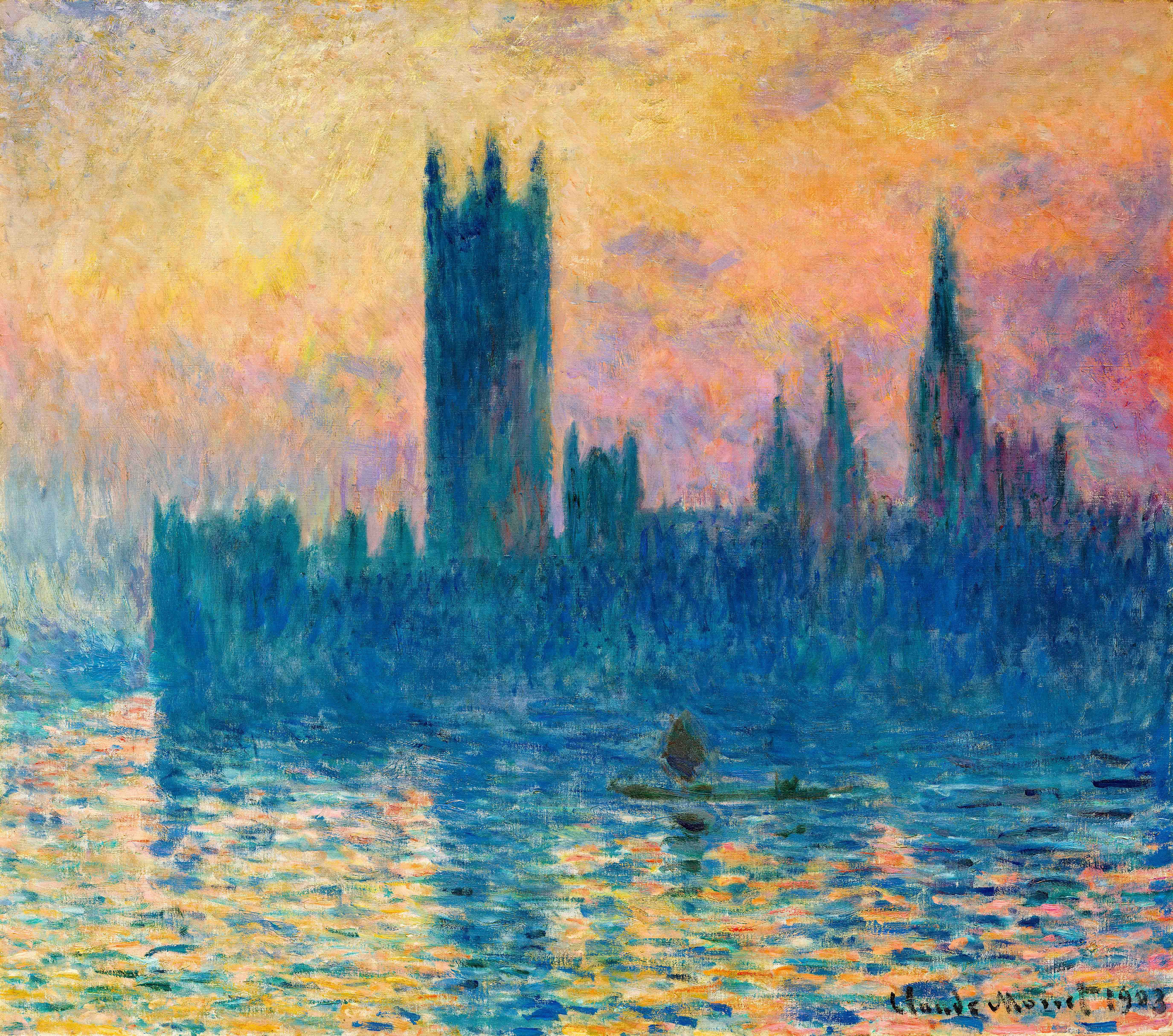
The Houses of Parliament, sunset (1903), National Gallery of Art, Washington, D.C.

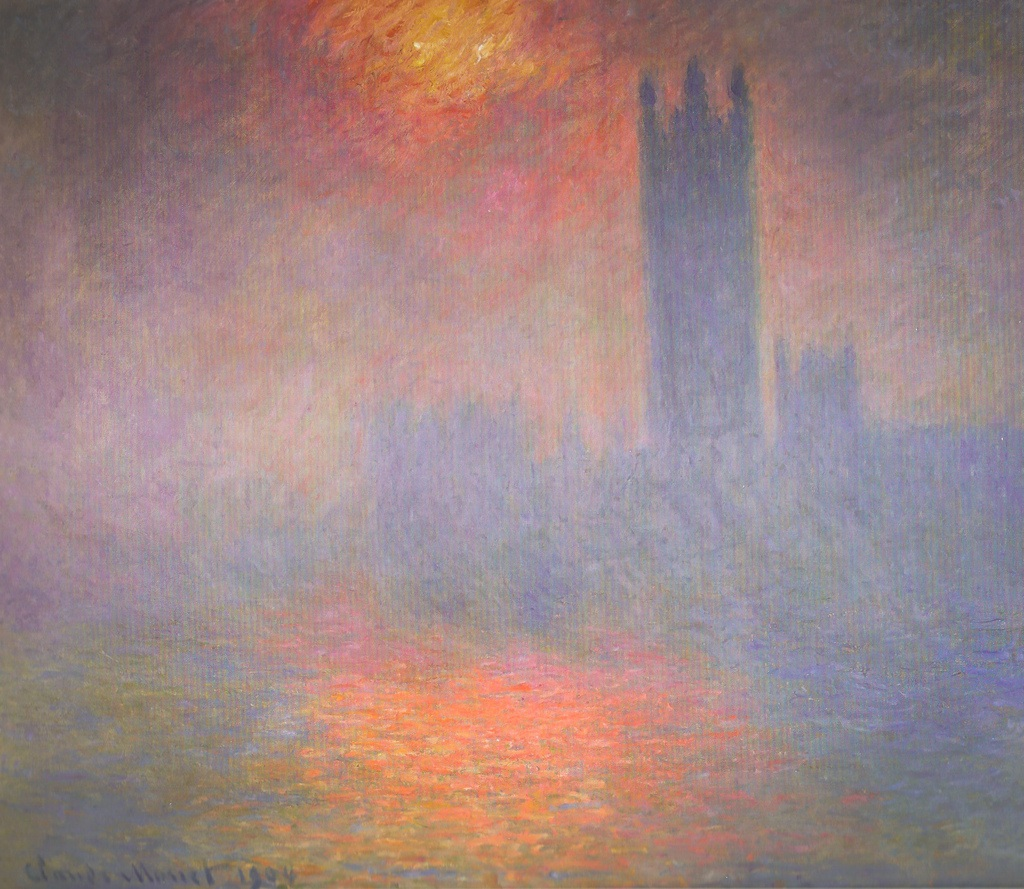
London, Houses of Parliament. The Sun Shining through the Fog (1904), Musée d'Orsay, Paris

During three trips to London between 1899 and 1901, Impressionist painter Claude Monet worked on a series of canvasses that depicted the Palace of Westminster under various lighting conditions; the building was often shrouded in the smog prevalent in the city in Victorian times. The paintings share the same vantage point—a terrace at St Thomas's Hospital, across the river from the Palace—and many of the works were finished in Monet's studio in France over the following years.

The exterior of the Palace of Westminster—especially the Elizabeth Tower which houses the bell known as Big Ben, and its setting on the bank of the River Thames—is recognised worldwide, and is one of the most visited tourist attractions in London. Tsar Nicholas I called it "a dream in stone". The United Nations Educational, Scientific and Cultural Organization (UNESCO) classifies the Palace of Westminster, along with neighbouring Westminster Abbey and St Margaret's, as a World Heritage Site. It is also a Grade I listed building.

Although there is no casual access to the interior of the palace, there are several ways to gain admittance. UK residents may obtain tickets from an MP for a place in the viewing ("strangers") gallery of the House of Commons, or from a Lord for a seat in the gallery of the House of Lords. It is also possible for both UK residents and overseas visitors to queue for admission to them at any time of the day or night when either House is in session, but capacity is limited and there is no guarantee of admission. Either House may exclude "strangers" if it desires to sit in private. Members of the public can also queue for a seat in a committee session, where admission is free and places cannot be booked, or they may visit the Parliamentary Archives for research purposes. Booking an appointment is necessary in the latter case, along with proof of identity.

External videos
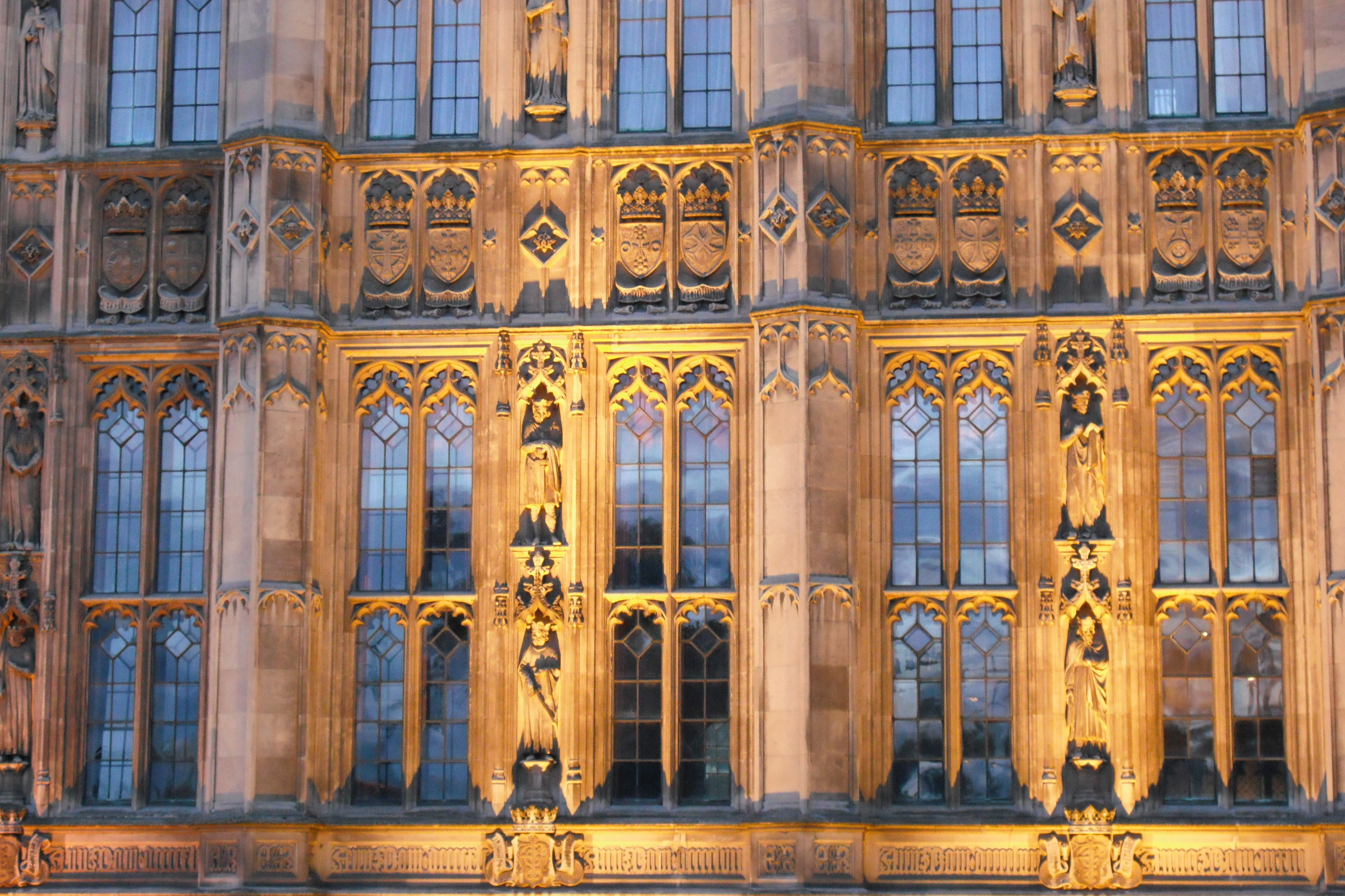
- Charles Barry and A. W. N. Pugin, Palace of Westminster (Houses of Parliament), 1840–70, Smarthistory, 6:27

Free guided tours of the palace are held throughout the parliamentary session for UK residents, who can apply through their MP or a member of the House of Lords. The tours last about 75 minutes and include the state rooms, the chambers of the two Houses and Westminster Hall. Paid-for tours are available to both UK and overseas visitors during the summer recess and Saturdays throughout the year. Tours of the Elizabeth Tower were suspended until 2021 while the tower underwent refurbishment.

Architectural historian Dan Cruickshank selected the palace as one of his five choices for the 2006 BBC television documentary series Britain's Best Buildings.

The nearest London Underground station is Westminster, on the District, Circle and Jubilee lines.

In 2015, Parliament organised a year-long programme of events called "Parliament in the Making" to celebrate the 800th anniversary of the sealing of Magna Carta on 15 June, and the 750th anniversary of the first representative parliament on 20 January. Events were coordinated with Parliament Week. The BBC held events throughout the year including a "Democracy Day" on 20 January consisting of live discussions and debate in partnership with the Speaker's Office of the House of Commons, including broadcasts from inside the Palace of Westminster.

== See also ==
- Proposed relocation of the Parliament of the United Kingdom
- List of legislative buildings
  - Parliament Buildings (Northern Ireland)
  - Senedd building
  - Scottish Parliament Building
- Official royal residences in London:
  - Buckingham Palace – The principal royal residence since 1837
  - Kensington Palace – The principal residence of English and later British monarchs between 1689 and 1760
  - Palace of Whitehall – The principal residence of the English kings from 1530 until 1689
  - St James's Palace – The principal royal residence from 1702 until 1837, which continues today as the formal palace of the monarchy as the Court of St James's
    - Clarence House – a princely home, built on palace grounds in the 1820s.
    - Bushy House – future William IV took up residence here in 1797 when appointed Ranger of Bushy Park, and remained through his reign as king (1830–1837)
