= Introduction (House of Lords) =

Induction ceremony for new members in the House of Lords

The introduction is a ceremony in the House of Lords of the United Kingdom by which a new member is "introduced" to the existing membership. Introductions in the Lords are more elaborate than those in the House of Commons.

== Origins ==
Originally, the Sovereign created and invested new peers personally. The personal procedure, however, was abandoned during the 17th century, and in 1621, the House of Lords began the ceremony of introduction. The ceremony has evolved over the years, generally growing more complex. However, in 1998, the Select Committee on Introductions suggested several reforms, which were generally adopted.

== Introduced lords ==
Ceremonial introductions were originally used for all new members of the House of Lords. However, in 1663, the House of Lords decided that peers who inherited a title did not need to be introduced. Until the abolition of hereditary peers in 2026, this applied to hereditary peers joining the House by virtue of by-elections under the House of Lords Act 1999. However, if hereditary peers received life peerages, they were introduced like any other life peer, unless they sat in the Lords before the House of Lords Act 1999.

The Lords Spiritual (twenty-six bishops of the Church of England who sit in the House of Lords) are also introduced, though by a different ceremony, upon appointment. Also, a Lord Spiritual who is translated (transferred) to another see must be reintroduced.

== Lords Temporal ceremony ==
The ceremony of Introduction used prior to 1998 was much more complicated than the present ceremony. Originally, the Lord Chancellor in court dress (including a tricorn hat), or a Deputy Speaker in parliamentary robes, would occupy the Woolsack. A procession would be formed outside the Chamber, with the members of the procession standing in the following order:

1. The Gentleman Usher of the Black Rod or his deputy
2. The Garter Principal King of Arms or another herald
3. The new peer's junior supporter
4. The new peer
5. The new peer's senior supporter

When a member of the Royal Family was being introduced, there would often be more in the procession, as the Great Officers of State and the Great Officers of the Household (and sometimes others, such as an aide-de-camp carrying a coronet) would be involved. The group would start in the Robing Room, also.

The supporters were members of the House of Lords of the same rank of peerage as the new peer. (In other words, Dukes would support Dukes, Marquesses would support Marquesses, and so forth.) The new peer and his/her supporters would wear parliamentary robes and bicorn hats if men or caps if women. The procession would enter the Chamber, proceed towards the Lord Chancellor (the peer and his/her supporters stopping thrice to bow towards the Cloth of Estate before reaching the Lord Chancellor), and the Garter Principal King of Arms would present the peer's letters patent, which are issued by the sovereign to create a new peerage, and the new peer would kneel before the Lord Chancellor (or remain standing if a member of the Royal Family) and present his/her writ of summons, which is issued by the sovereign to command the peer's attendance in Parliament. The Reading Clerk of the House of Lords would then read aloud the letters patent and the writ. The peer would take the Oath of Allegiance or the Solemn Affirmation, and would sign the Test Roll, at the top of which the same Oath is written.

Thereafter, the Garter Principal King of Arms would "place" the new peer and his supporters by leading them to the Lords bench traditionally occupied by those of the new peer's rank (senior members of the Royal Family were led to a chair of state on the Throne dais rather than be placed on a bench). The peer and supporters would put on their hats, rise, doff their hats (unless women), and bow to the Lord Chancellor, and then repeat the previous practice twice. After bowing to the Lord Chancellor for the third time, the peers would, alongside the Garter Principal King of Arms and the Gentleman Usher of the Black Rod, leave the Chamber, with the new peer shaking hands with the Lord Chancellor as he/she left. The new peer would later return, and possibly participate in a debate (a member of the Royal Family, earlier seated beside the Throne, would now sit on the Crossbenches, signifying his/her political neutrality).

In 1998, the House of Lords constituted a Committee to modernise the entire ceremony. The Committee found that "Far from being dignified, the practice of kneeling to the Lord Chancellor is particularly awkward because the new peer, wearing robes, simply kneels down on the floor with nothing to lean on for support [We] see no need to retain the act of kneeling before the Lord Chancellor." The Committee also recommended that the reading of the writ of summons, which is of the same form for all peers, be ceased, though the reading of the Letters Patent, which are often unique to the peer, be continued. The Committee further suggested that the wearing of hats and the hat doffing ceremony, which "serves no symbolic purpose", also stop. Finally, it deemed that, since the seating of Lords in order of the degree of peerage was an outdated practice, the Lords instead sitting by party, the practice of placing the new peer stop.

The present ceremony involves the same procession as the former one, but, instead of proceeding to the Woolsack, it stops in front of the Table of the House. The Reading Clerk reads the Letters Patent presented to him by the Garter Principal King of Arms, and administers the Oath of Allegiance or Solemn Affirmation to the new peer. The new peer and his/her supporters together bow to the Cloth of Estate, which is placed at the end of the House, behind the sovereign's throne and the Woolsack. The procession then proceeds out of the Chamber, the new peer stopping at the Woolsack to shake hands with the Lord Chancellor. Upon returning to the Chamber, the new peer takes any seat he/she pleases, sitting with his/her party, or, if neutral, sitting amongst the Crossbenchers.

The role of presiding over the House of Lords was removed from the office of Lord Chancellor by the Constitutional Reform Act 2005. As a result, the Lord Chancellor's former role in introductions has been the Lord Speaker's since 2006.

== Lords Spiritual ceremony ==
The ceremony for Lords Spiritual has been significantly simpler, and was not affected by the recommendations of the 1998 Committee. The Gentleman Usher of the Black Rod and the Garter Principal King of Arms do not take part. The supporters of the Lords Spiritual are, in all cases, other Lords Spiritual; the new member and the supporters wear their clerical robes. The procession, with the junior supporter in front and the senior supporter behind the new archbishop or bishop, arrives in front of the Table of the House. The new member then submits his/her writ of summons, which is read by a Clerk. (Archbishops and bishops do not, with regards to their lordships, have letters patent to present.) The Clerk then administers the Oath. Then, the procession progresses to the Woolsack, where the new archbishop or bishop shakes hands with the Lord Speaker. Then, instead of leaving the Chamber, the new member and his/her supporters immediately take seats on the Bishops' Benches. (Archbishops and bishops do not sit with any particular party, though the two Bishops' Benches are on the same side of the Chamber as the seats for members of the Government party.)
