= Introduction (British House of Commons) =

In the House of Commons of the United Kingdom, members of the House elected at a by-election must be formally "introduced" to the House. (Members elected at a general election are not introduced.) The ceremony in the Commons is considerably simpler than those in the House of Lords.

By-elections are generally held on Thursdays, and the introduction in the afternoon of the Tuesday after the election. The new Member enters the Chamber along with two other members acting as "supporters" and bows to the Speaker. The Member and supporters then process to the Speaker's table, where the new Member takes the Oath of Allegiance or Solemn Affirmation. Then, the Member signs the Test Roll, at the top of which the Oath is written. Finally, the Member returns to sit along with the rest of his or her party.
