= The Burning of the Houses of Lords and Commons =

Painting by J. M. W. Turner

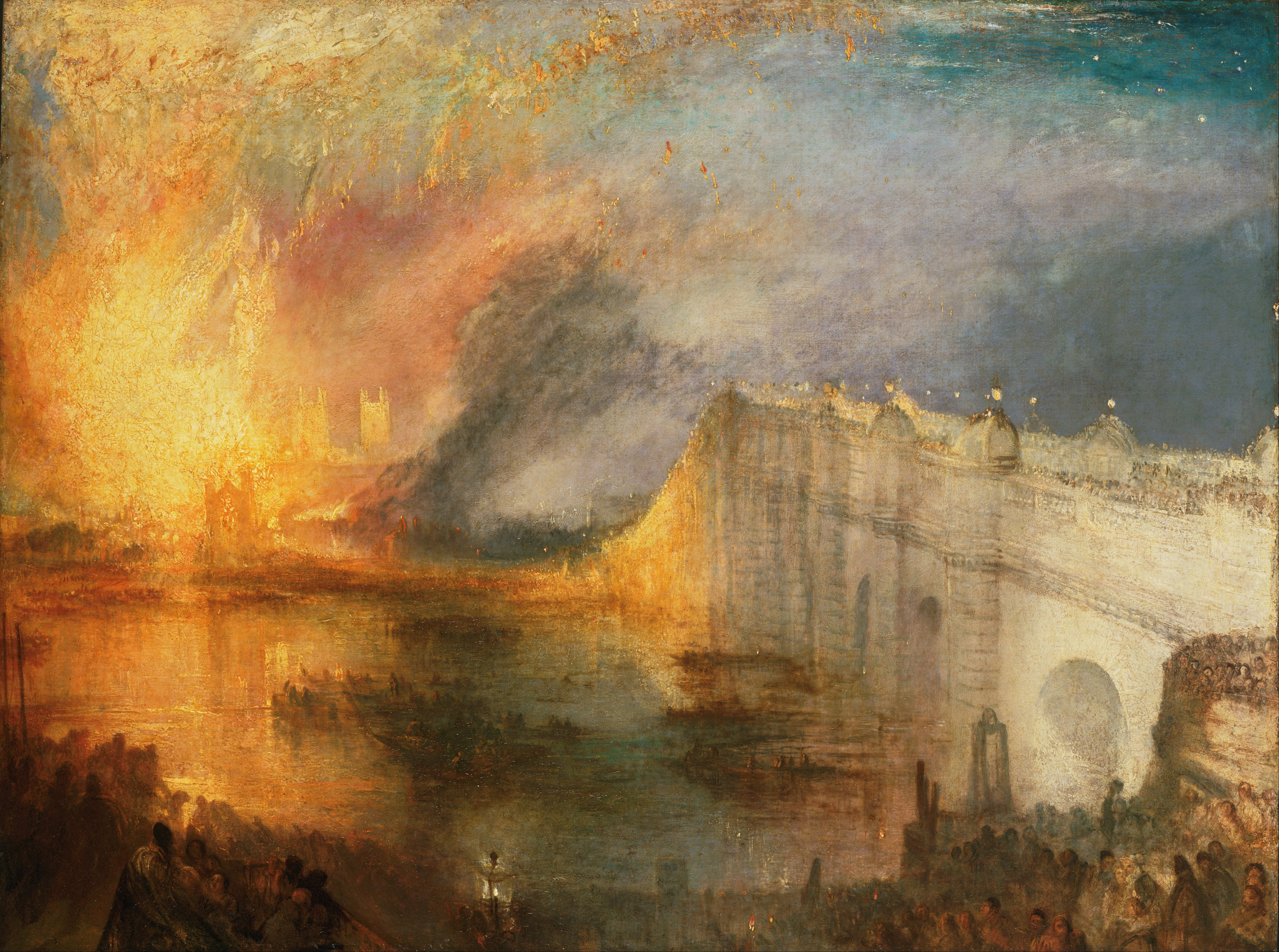
Philadelphia Museum of Art, 36.2 in (92 cm) x 48.5 in (123.1 cm)

Cleveland Museum of Art, 92 cm (36.2 in) x 123 cm (48.4 in)

The Burning of the Houses of Lords and Commons, 16th October, 1834 is the title of two oil on canvas paintings by J. M. W. Turner, depicting different views of the fire that broke out at the Houses of Parliament on the evening of 16 October 1834. They are now in the Philadelphia Museum of Art and Cleveland Museum of Art.

Along with thousands of other spectators, Turner himself witnessed the Burning of Parliament from the south bank of the River Thames, opposite Westminster. He made sketches using both pencil and watercolour in two sketchbooks from different vantage points, including from a rented boat, although it is unclear that the sketches were made instantly, en plein air. The sketchbooks were left by Turner to the National Gallery as part of the Turner Bequest and are now held by the Tate Gallery. Some other sketches in Turner's sketchbooks, previously thought to also show the Burning of Parliament, have been reassessed and may be sketches of the fire that destroyed the Grand Storehouse at the Tower of London on 30 October 1841.

It is not clear why Turner painted two oil versions of the same event. Financially, there was an opportunity for more engravings to be produced from his pictures. However, the two paintings portray very different aspects of the fire and Turner might have wished to explore multiple angles of the same event.

The paintings were made in late 1834 or early 1835 and both measure 92.1 centimetres (36.3 in) by 123.2 centimetres (48.5 in). Turner spent many hours reworking both paintings on the varnishing day immediately before the exhibition opened to the public.

The first painting, exhibited at the British Institution in February 1835, shows the Houses of Parliament from the upstream side of Westminster Bridge. The buildings on the other side of the river are wreathed in golden flames. The fire is consuming the chamber of the House of Commons in St Stephen's Hall, and illuminating the towers of Westminster Abbey. The fire reflects dull red in the water, with a crowd of spectators in the foreground. To the right of the painting, Westminster Bridge looms like an iceberg, larger than life, but the perspective of the part of the bridge closest to the far bank is strongly distorted where it is lit up by the flames. Parts of the painting were likely inspired by a newspaper account that Turner read in The Times the day after the fire. The painting was acquired by the Philadelphia Museum of Art in 1928 as part of the John Howard McFadden Collection.

The second painting was exhibited at the Royal Academy's Summer Exhibition of 1835 at Somerset House. It shows a similar scene from further downstream, closer to Waterloo Bridge, with the flames and smoke blown dramatically over the Thames as spectators on the river bank and in boats look on. These details all build up to a serious narrative about the failings of the firefighting system at this time. In the bottom right hand corner, we see fightfighting boats being slowly tugged towards the fire, which at this point is so big that their efforts are pointless. This painting was acquired by the Cleveland Museum of Art in 1942 as a bequest from John L. Severance (son of oil magnate Louis Severance).

The colours and composition of these paintings may have influenced Turner's conception of his 1839 painting The Fighting Temeraire, which also depicts the passing of an old order.

== See also ==
- List of paintings by J. M. W. Turner
- 100 Great Paintings, 1980 BBC series
