= Walter of Durham =

Medieval English painter and craftsman, builder of the Coronation Chair

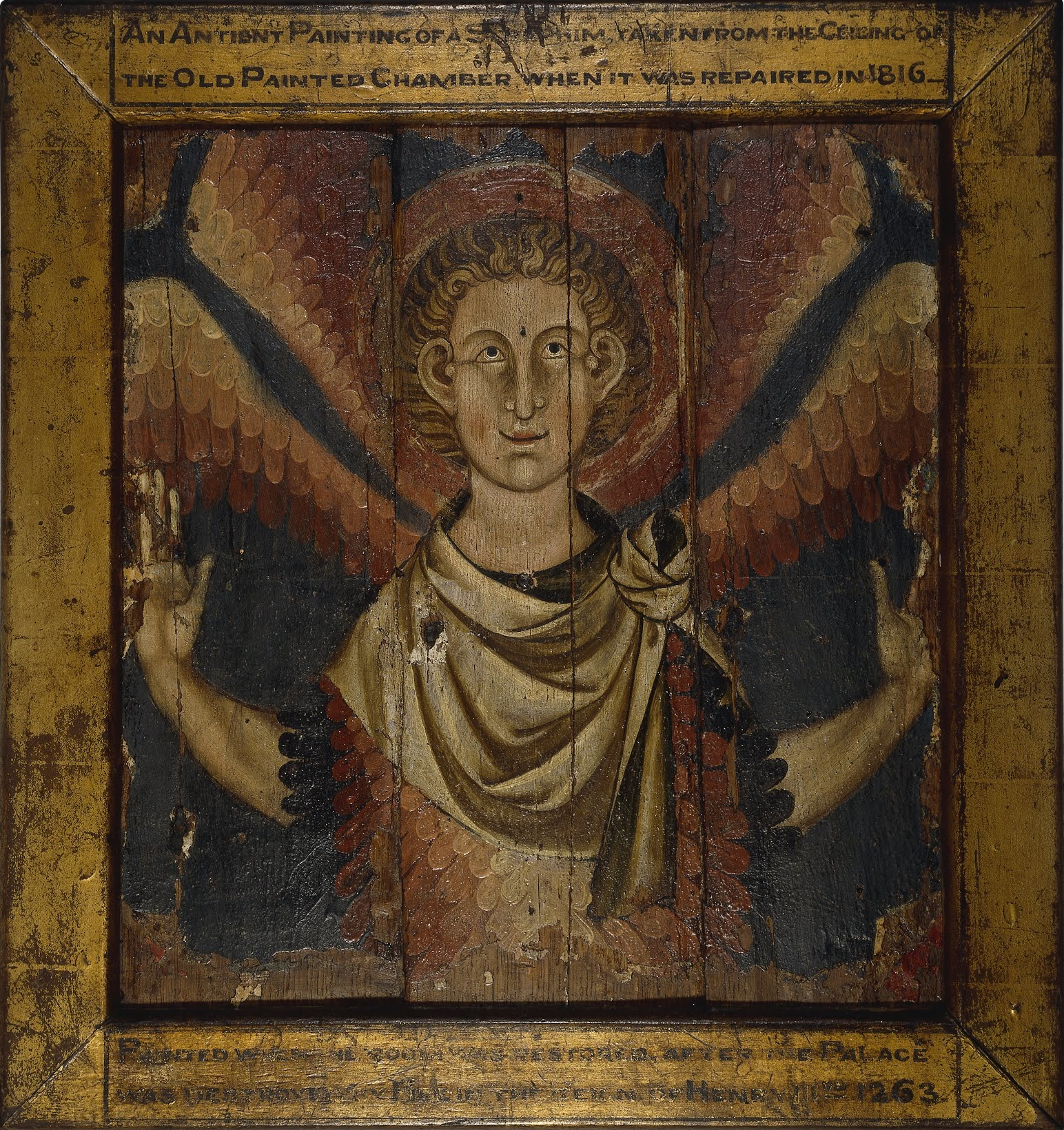
British Museum, c. 1265: Winged seraph on wooden ceiling panel from Painted Chamber, most likely by Walter of Durham and his workshop.

Walter of Durham (died c. 1305) was a thirteenth-century painter and craftsman who was in service to Henry III and his son Edward I. Details of his life have been ascertained from records in royal ledgers, which show that his son Thomas of Westminster followed the same career. Walter's work, principally in Westminster Palace and Westminster Abbey, included the decoration of the walls and ceiling of the Painted Chamber, the painting and gilding of royal tombs, and the construction of the Coronation Chair to house the Stone of Scone.

== Under Henry III ==
Walter of Durham was already established as a master painter by 1265, when he is known to have painted statues in Westminster Palace for Henry III. The following year he restored murals destroyed by the palace fire of 1263, in what later became known as the Painted Chamber. In 1270 he was appointed to a royal serjeanty with the unofficial role of pictor regis. He performed the normal duties of a medieval painter, which included carpentry. Under Henry III, he and his workshop continued to work in the Palace and in Westminster Abbey, and also designed a barge for the queen, Eleanor of Provence.

== Under Edward I ==
He continued to work in Westminster Palace in 1289 under Edward I, making further repairs to the Painted Chamber in the 1290s. In Westminster Abbey in the 1290s he decorated the tombs of Henry III and Eleanor of Castile, the wife of Edward I; at Blackfriars he painted the tomb for her heart. His last recorded commission was between 1297 and 1300, when he painted and crafted the Coronation Chair, a gilded and painted wooden chair. It was installed in Westminster Abbey next to the shrine of Edward the Confessor and housed the Stone of Scone, which Edward I captured from the Scots in 1296.

== Legacy ==
The painted chamber was destroyed by fire in 1834. During repairs in 1816, four of the original 13th-century ceiling panels of a seraph and the three prophets Isaiah, Jeremiah and Jonah were removed by Adam Lee, the "Labourer in Trust" at Westminster Palace. They were mentioned as being in his private collection in an 1839 treatise on painting. Two of the panels—the seraph and a prophet—resurfaced in Bristol in 1993 and, after being confirmed as the work of Walter of Durham and his workshop, were purchased by the British Museum in 1995. Some of the earliest surviving examples of English painting on wood, the painted oak panels show the influence of French Gothic art and mark a departure from the earlier style of William of Westminster, Walter's predecessor at court. One of the ornamental bosses from the ceiling is preserved in the Sir John Soane's Museum. Although none of the murals survive, when they were rediscovered in the early 1800s, Charles Stothard made watercolour copies for Volume VI of Vetusta Monumenta, published by the Society of Antiquaries; and Thomas Crofton Croker, clerk of works at Westminster, produced an additional set, now held by the Victoria and Albert Museum and the Ashmolean Museum. Reconstructions of Walter's tomb paintings by E. W. Tristram can still be seen in Westminster Abbey.

== Gallery ==
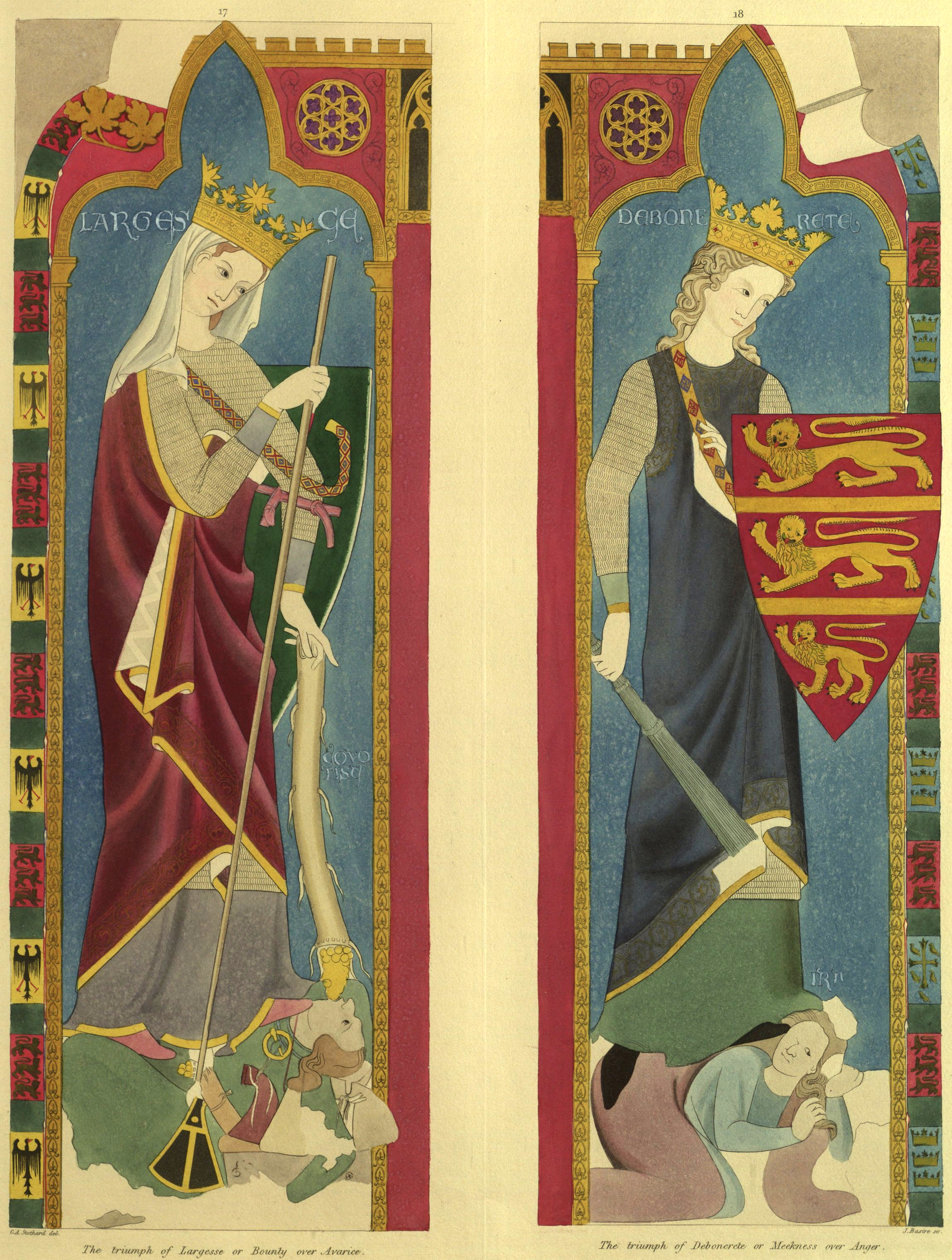
Watercolour copies of window reveals from Painted Chamber, Charles Stothard

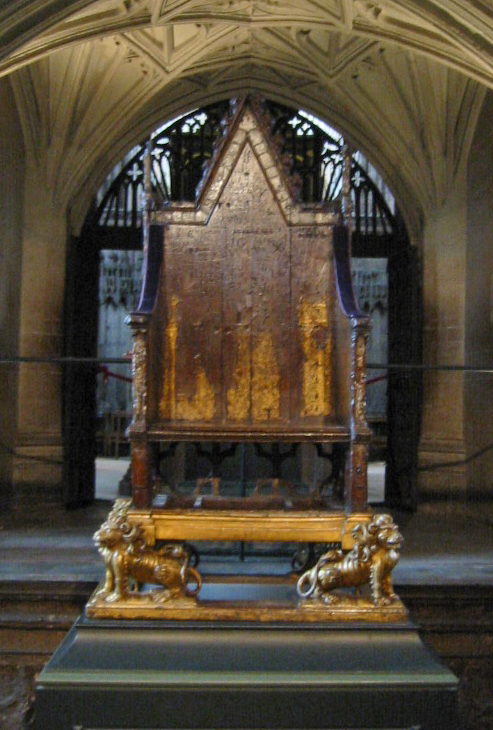
The coronation chair in Westminster Abbey
