= White Chamber =

Demolished hall in Westminster, United Kingdom

Coordinates: 51.4988°N 0.1252°W

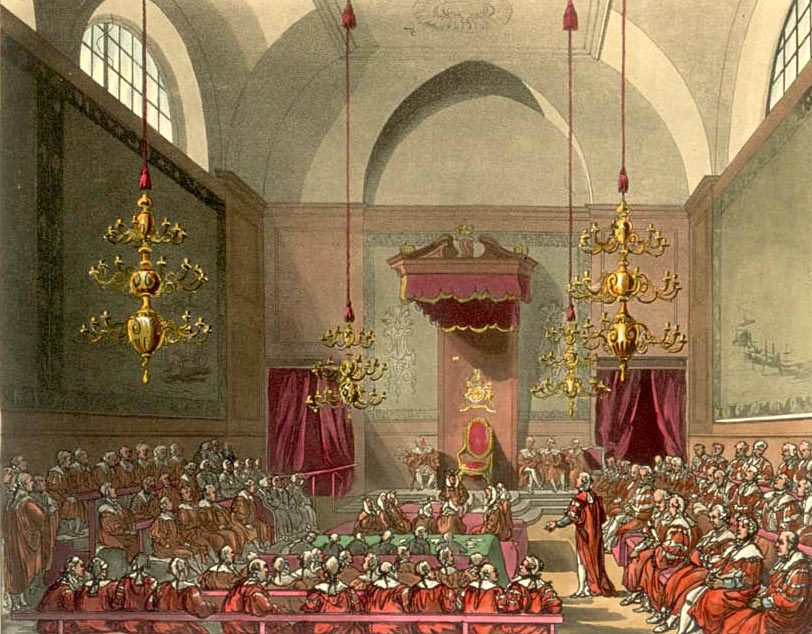
The White Chamber housing the House of Lords, c. 1809

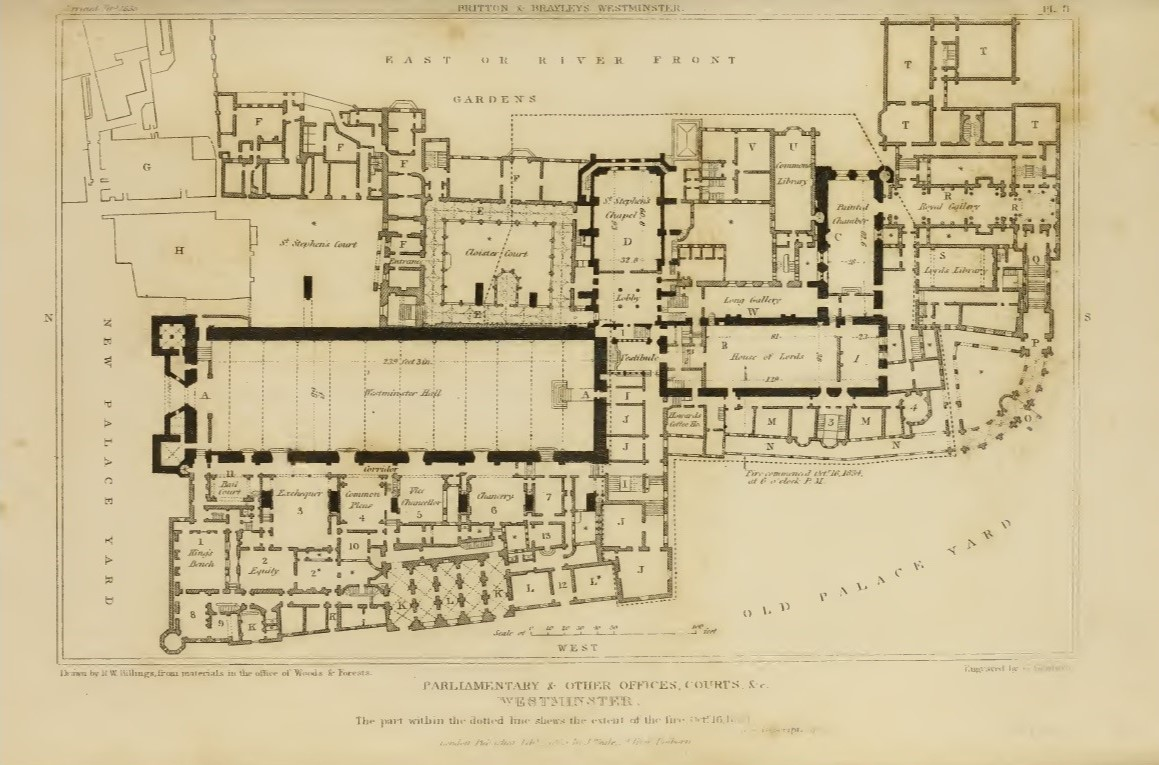
Plan of the Palace of Westminster in 1834, showing the position of the White Chamber, south (right) of Westminster Hall, and perpendicular to St Stephen's Chapel and the Painted Chamber to the east (top)

The White Chamber was part of the medieval Palace of Westminster. Originally a dining hall, and then the location for the Court of Requests, it was the meeting place of the House of Lords from 1801 until it was gutted by fire in 1834. Re-roofed, it was the temporary home of the House of Commons until 1851, when it was pulled down for the building of the new Palace of Westminster.

Also known as the Lesser Hall, the White Hall or the Greater White Chamber, it measured 120 by 34 feet (37 m × 10 m). It was situated to the south of the somewhat larger Westminster Hall (the Great Hall), with the same north–south alignment. It was built c. 1167 as a dining hall, and then remodelled by Henry III, adjacent to his new King's Chamber to the east, which was perpendicular to the south end of the White Chamber. The King's Chamber was originally a state bedchamber, and later used for state ceremonies; due to its lavish painted decoration, it became known as the Painted Chamber. To the south of the east end of the King's Chamber was the Queen's Chamber, an even smaller chamber for his queen, Eleanor of Provence. (The Queen's Chamber was also sometimes known as the White Chamber; to avoid confusion with the other White Chamber, the Lesser Hall might be distinguished as the Great White Chamber or the White Hall.)

Like the King's Chamber and the Queen's Chamber, the White Chamber was on the upper storey of the building, with cellars for the services below. The White Chamber was repaired after a fire in 1298 which destroyed the old St Stephen's Chapel.

The custom grew for Parliament to be convened by the King in the Painted Chamber, and then from c.1259 the Lords retired to the Queen's Chamber and the Commons elsewhere (sometimes in the Chapter House of Westminster Abbey; later to the rebuilt St Stephen's Chapel, which ran east–west to the north end of the White Chamber). Guy Fawkes was caught in the cellars below the Queen's Chamber (formerly the Royal kitchens) in 1605.

The White Chamber was the home of the Court of Requests (also known as the Court of Conscience) until 1642. The Court of Requests was associated with the Privy Council, and heard complaints and petitions to the King. The Court became known as the "Court of White Hall".

The House of Lords moved from the Queen's Chamber to the White Hall in 1801, as it needed more space to accommodate Irish peers after the Act of Union with Ireland. When used as the House of Lords, the King's throne was located on a dais at the south end of the White Hall, with the Lord Chancellor's woolsack and a table in front for the house's clerks and mace, surrounded by benches on three sides - for the government, the opposition, and the non-partisan crossbenches. Tapestries were hung from the walls, showing the defeat of the Spanish Armada. It was lit by high, semicircular windows.

The vacated Queen's Chamber, and the Prince's Chamber, were pulled down by Sir John Soane in 1823 to create a new Royal Gallery and Staircase. The White Chamber survived, but was gutted in the devastating fire in 1834. The fire started in the cellar below the White Chamber, where piles of unwanted tally sticks were being destroyed in two furnaces used to warm the chamber above. Many of the other principal rooms of the palace were severely damaged, including the Painted Chamber and St Stephen's Chapel. The Great Hall was largely unscathed.

The Painted Chamber and White Chamber were re-roofed so the House of Lords could move temporarily to the former, and the Commons to the latter.

The ruins of the White Chamber were demolished in September 1851 to make way for the building of the new Palace of Westminster.
