= St Mary Undercroft =

Coordinates: 51°29′58″N 0°7′30″W

- Chapel of Saint Mary Undercroft
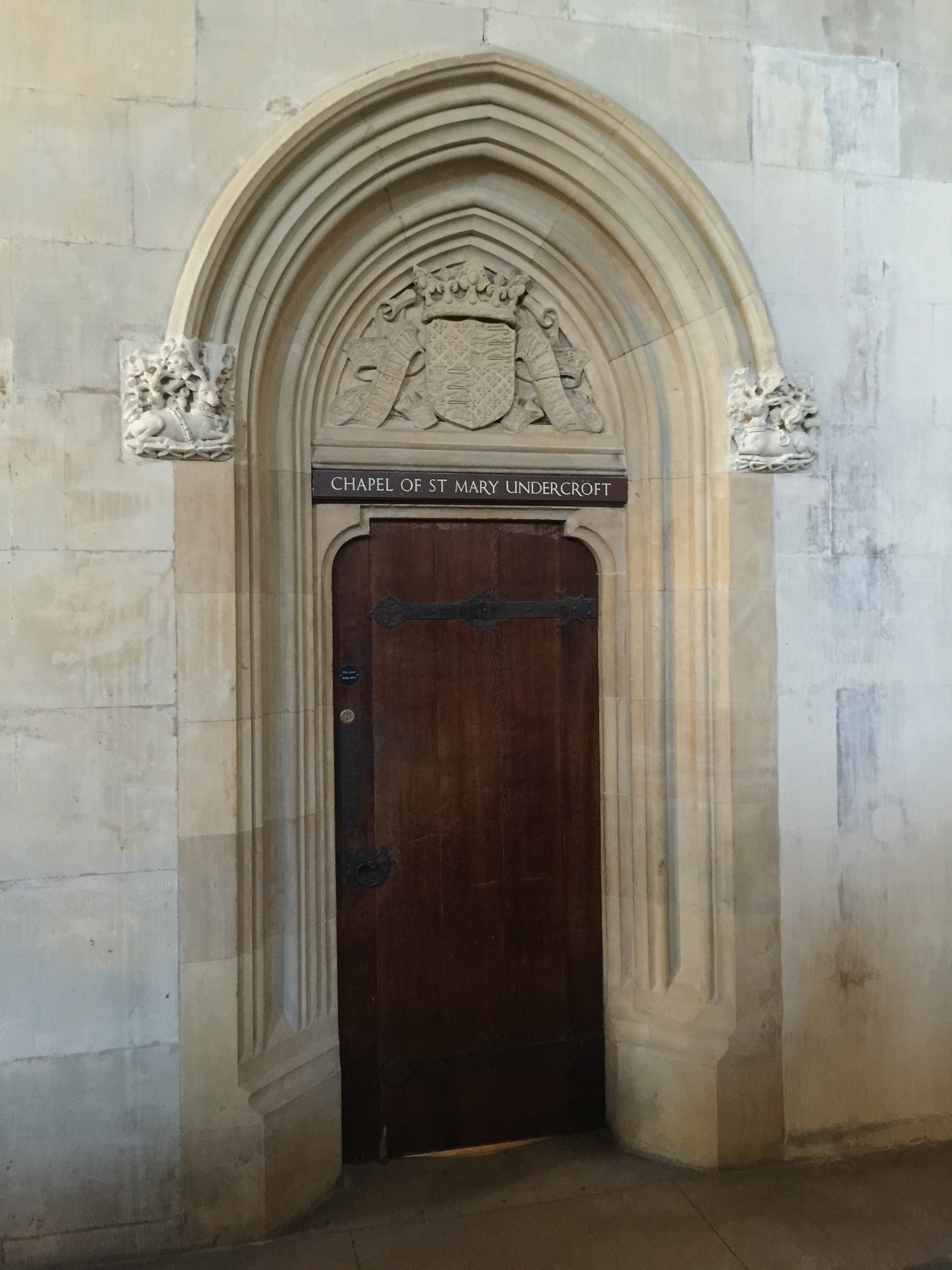

- Location within Central London
- Location: Palace of Westminster, London
- Country: England
- Denomination: Church of England

History
- Founded: 1297
- Dedication: Blessed Virgin Mary
- Dedicated: 1641

Administration
- Diocese: Royal Peculiar

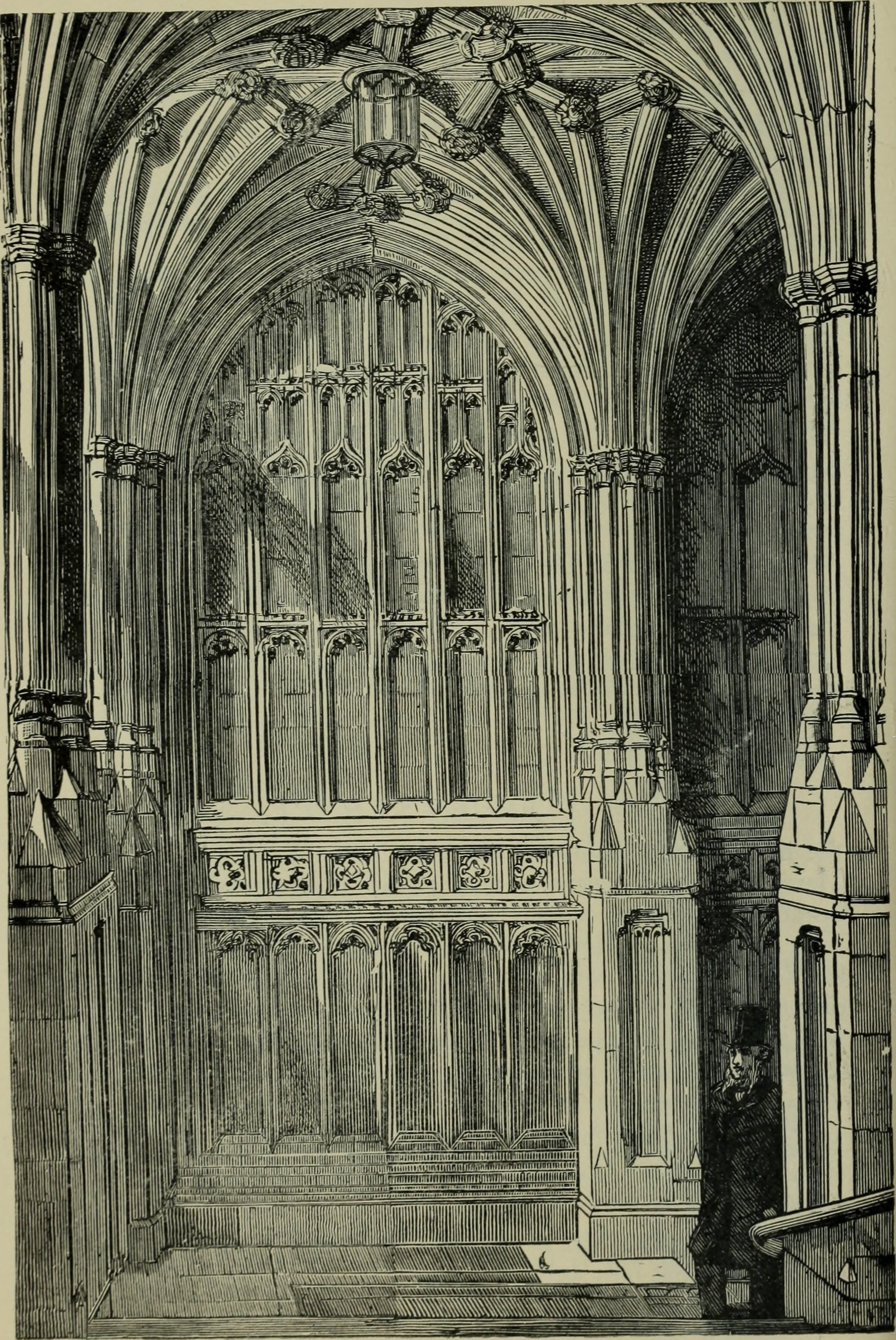
Print from the Guide to the Palace of Westminster (1911)

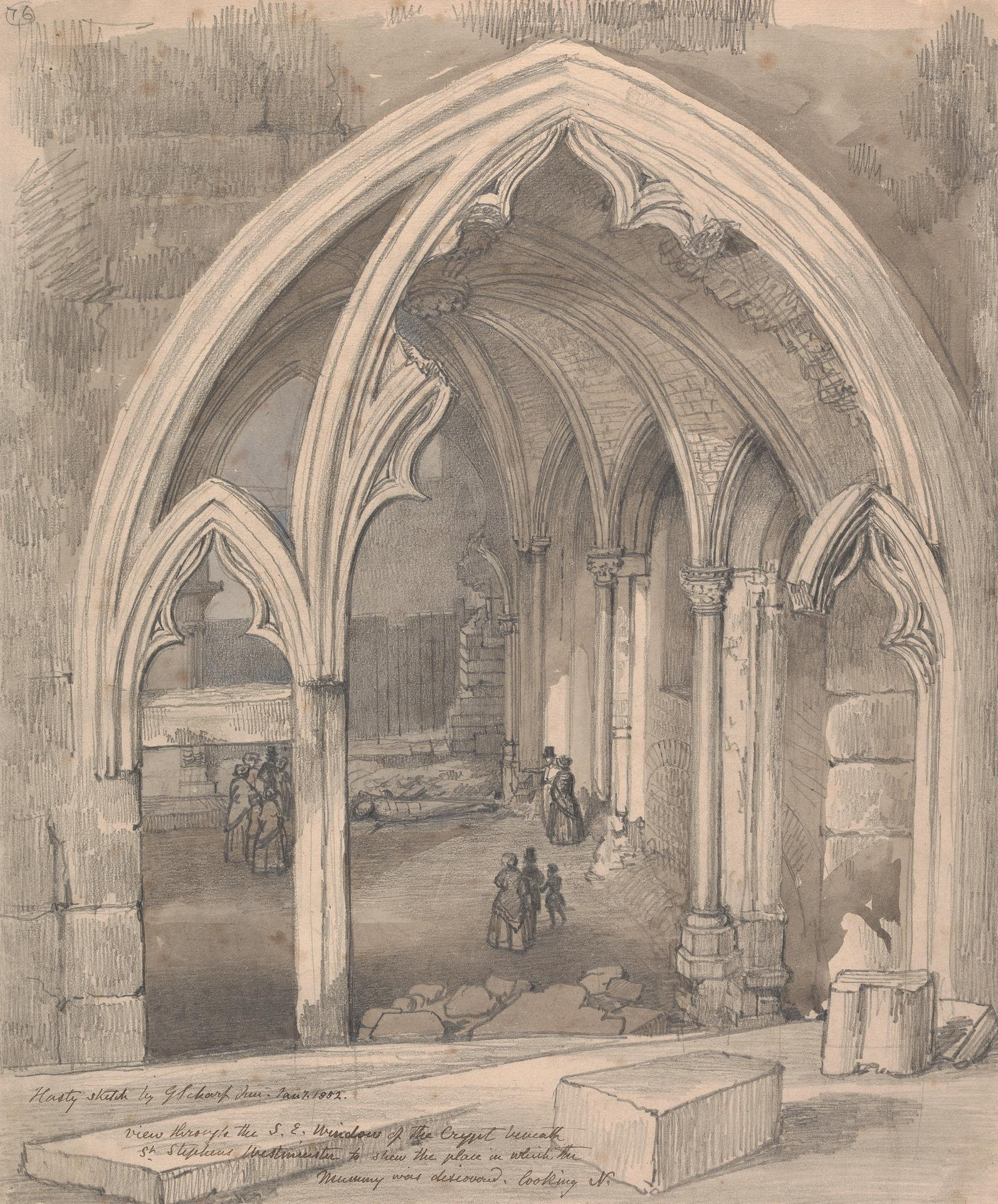
"View through the South East Window of the Crypt beneath St Stephen's, Westminster" by George Johann Scharf, 1852

The Chapel of St Mary Undercroft is a Church of England chapel located in the Palace of Westminster, London, England. The chapel is accessed via a flight of stairs in the south east corner of Westminster Hall.

It had been a crypt below St Stephen's Chapel and had fallen into disuse, being used at various times as a wine cellar, dining room for Speakers (who had holes bored into the wall to accommodate two kitchen chimneys) and (now unconfirmed by records) stables for Oliver Cromwell's horses.

After the fire had destroyed St Stephen's Chapel in 1834, the undercroft returned to its former use as a place of worship. Although much stonework was damaged in the fire, it was decorated in the 1860s by Edward Middleton Barry with gilded, painted and stencilled designs in rich colours to cover the walls, floor and vaulting. The backdrop of the altar depicts royal British saints.

On the census night of 2 April 1911, suffragette Emily Davison hid in a cupboard overnight in the Chapel in order to be entered on the census form for the building as a way of ensuring her address was recorded as the House of Commons. A commemorative plaque, unveiled by Tony Benn in 1999, is fixed to the inside face of the cupboard door.

It is still used for worship today. In particular, children of peers, who possess the title of "The Honourable", have the privilege of being able to use it as a wedding venue. In addition, peers and members of Parliament have the right to use the chapel as a place of christening in the baptistery and font (whose basin was made from a single slab of alabaster) designed by Barry.

It is a Royal Peculiar chapel – outside the responsibility of any diocesan bishop. The building is administered through the Lord Great Chamberlain and Black Rod and it has no dedicated clergy: by convention services were conducted by the Rector of St Margaret's, Westminster, a member of the Chapter of Westminster Abbey. In 2010 the Speaker of the House of Commons used his right of appointment to nominate an outsider, Rose Hudson-Wilkin, as the Speaker's Chaplain.

The body of former Prime Minister Margaret Thatcher was kept in St Mary Undercroft on the night before her funeral in April 2013. The honour was also accorded to the body of Tony Benn, the long-serving Labour politician, before his funeral in March 2014, as well as that of PC Keith Palmer who was fatally stabbed carrying out his duties on the palace grounds during the 2017 Westminster attack.
