= List of acts of the 1st session of the 49th Parliament of the United Kingdom =

This is a list of acts of the 1st session of the 49th Parliament of the United Kingdom, which ran from 15 June 1983 until 31 October 1984.

Acts passed since 1963 are cited by calendar year, as opposed to the convention used for earlier acts of citing the regnal year(s) in which the relevant parliamentary session was held. Each act passed in a respective year is given a chapter number (abbreviated "c."), denoted by Arabic numerals in the case of public general acts, lowercase Roman numerals in the case of local acts, or italicised Arabic numerals in the case of personal acts. These run as separate series.

113 acts of Parliament were passed by the 49th Parliament in its 1st session: 73 public general acts and 40 local acts.

indicates that an act is available to view at legislation.gov.uk, and indicates the location of the original act in the Parliamentary Archives.

== Public general acts ==
{{legislationuk|act |- | {{|Appropriation (No. 2) Act 1983|public|48|26-07-1983|An Act to apply a sum out of the Consolidated Fund to the service of the year ending on 31st March 1984, and to appropriate the supplies granted in this Session of Parliament.}} |- | {{|Finance (No. 2) Act 1983|public|49|26-07-1983|maintained=y|An Act to grant certain duties, to alter other duties, and to amend the law relating to the National Debt and the Public Revenue, and to make further provision in connection with Finance.}} |- | {{|Companies (Beneficial Interests) Act 1983|public|50|26-07-1983|maintained=y|An Act to provide for disregarding certain interests and rights in determining for the purposes of provisions of the Companies Act 1948 and the Companies Act 1980 whether a company is beneficially interested under a trust or has a beneficial interest in shares.}} |- | {{|International Monetary Arrangements Act 1983|public|51|26-07-1983|maintained=y|An Act to substitute a new limit for the limit on lending to the International Monetary Fund imposed by section 2(1) of the International Monetary Fund Act 1979 and to provide for the Bank of England to be indemnified in respect of certain financial assistance.}} |- | {{|Local Authorities (Expenditure Powers) Act 1983|public|52|26-07-1983|maintained=y|An Act to remove certain restrictions on the powers of local authorities under section 137 of the Local Government Act 1972 and section 83 of the Local Government (Scotland) Act 1973.}} |- | {{|Car Tax Act 1983|public|53|26-07-1983|maintained=y|An Act to consolidate the enactments relating to car tax.}} |- | {{|Medical Act 1983|public|54|26-07-1983|maintained=y|An Act to consolidate the Medical Acts 1956 to 1978 and certain related provisions, with amendments to give effect to recommendations of the Law Commission and the Scottish Law Commission.}} |- | {{|Value Added Tax Act 1983|public|55|26-07-1983|maintained=y|An Act to consolidate the enactments relating to value added tax.}} |- | {{|Oil Taxation Act 1983|public|56|01-12-1983|maintained=y|An Act to vary the reliefs available for certain expenditure incurred in connection with assets used or to be used in connection with oil fields; to bring into charge to petroleum revenue tax certain sums received or receivable in respect of such assets and of certain other assets situated in the United Kingdom, the territorial sea thereof or a designated area, within the meaning of the Continental Shelf Act 1964; to amend Part II of the Oil Taxation Act 1975 in relation to sums so received or receivable; and for connected purposes.}} |- | {{|Consolidated Fund (No. 3) Act 1983|public|57|21-12-1983|An Act to apply certain sums out of the Consolidated Fund to the service of the years ending on 31st March 1984 and 1985.}} |- | {{|British Shipbuilders (Borrowing Powers) Act 1983|public|58|21-12-1983|maintained=y|An Act to amend section 11(7) of the Aircraft and Shipbuilding Industries Act 1977.}} |- | {{|Petroleum Royalties (Relief) Act 1983|public|59|21-12-1983|maintained=y|An Act to confer on holders of petroleum production licences an exemption from royalties (including royalties in kind) in respect of petroleum from certain new fields off the coast of Great Britain.}} |- | {{|Coal Industry Act 1983|public|60|21-12-1983|maintained=y|An Act to increase the limit on the borrowing powers of the National Coal Board; and to make further provision with respect to grants and payments by the Secretary of State in connection with the coal industry.}} |- | {{|Consolidated Fund Act 1984|public|1|13-03-1984|An Act to apply certain sums out of the Consolidated Fund to the service of the years ending on 31st March 1983 and 1984.}} |- | {{|Restrictive Trade Practices (Stock Exchange) Act 1984|public|2|13-03-1984|An Act to exempt certain agreements relating to The Stock Exchange from the Restrictive Trade Practices Act 1976.}} |- | {{|Occupiers' Liability Act 1984|public|3|13-03-1984|maintained=y|An Act to amend the law of England and Wales as to the liability of persons as occupiers of premises for injury suffered by persons other than their visitors; and to amend the Unfair Contract Terms Act 1977, as it applies to England and Wales, in relation to persons obtaining access to premises for recreational or educational purposes.}} |- | {{|Tourism (Overseas Promotion) (Scotland) Act 1984|public|4|13-03-1984|maintained=y|An Act to enable the Scottish Tourist Board to carry on abroad activities to promote tourism to and within Scotland.}} |- | {{|Merchant Shipping Act 1984|public|5|13-03-1984|maintained=y|An Act to make provision for the service of improvement notices and prohibition notices in connection with statutory provisions relating to the safety of ships and other matters; to make further provision with respect to the ascertainment of ships' tonnages for the purposes of section 503 of the Merchant Shipping Act 1894 and section 4 of the Merchant Shipping (Oil Pollution) Act 1971; and for connected purposes.}} |- | {{|Education (Amendment) (Scotland) Act 1984|public|6|13-03-1984|maintained=y|An Act to enable the Secretary of State to control the use of dangerous materials or apparatus in educational establishments in Scotland.}} |- | {{|Pensions Commutation Act 1984|public|7|13-03-1984|maintained=y|An Act to dissolve the Pensions Commutation Board and to amend the Pensions Commutation Act 1871.}} |- | {{|Prevention of Terrorism (Temporary Provisions) Act 1984|public|8|22-03-1984|An Act to repeal and re-enact with amendments the provisions of the Prevention of Terrorism (Temporary Provisions) Act 1976.}} |- | {{|Lotteries (Amendment) Act 1984|public|9|12-04-1984|maintained=y|An Act to amend the Lotteries and Amusements Act 1976 so as to abolish certain offences respecting foreign lotteries; and for connected purposes.}} |- | {{|Town and Country Planning Act 1984|public|10|12-04-1984|maintained=y|An Act to make further provision with respect to the application to Crown land of the enactments relating to town and country planning; and to enable persons in occupation of land by virtue of a licence in writing to appeal against certain enforcement notices issued under those enactments.}} |- | {{|Education (Grants and Awards) Act 1984|public|11|12-04-1984|maintained=y|An Act to make provision for the payment of education support grants to local education authorities in England and Wales; and to amend section 1(3)(d) of the Education Act 1962 so as to refer to the higher national diploma of the Business & Technician Education Council instead of to the corresponding diplomas of the Councils there mentioned.}} |- | {{|Telecommunications Act 1984|public|12|12-04-1984|maintained=y|An Act to provide for the appointment and functions of a Director General of Telecommunications; to abolish British Telecommunications' exclusive privilege with respect to telecommunications and to make new provision with respect to the provision of telecommunication services and certain related services; to make provision, in substitution for the Telegraph Acts 1863 to 1916 and Part IV of the Post Office Act 1969, for the matters there dealt with and related matters; to provide for the vesting of property, rights and liabilities of British Telecommunications in a company nominated by the Secretary of State and the subsequent dissolution of British Telecommunications; to make provision with respect to the finances of that company; to amend the Wireless Telegraphy Acts 1949 to 1967, to make further provision for facilitating enforcement of those Acts and otherwise to make provision with respect to wireless telegraphy apparatus and certain related apparatus; to give statutory authority for the payment out of money provided by Parliament of expenses incurred by the Secretary of State in providing a radio interference service; to increase the maximum number of members of British Telecommunications pending its dissolution; and for connected purposes.}} |- | {{|Road Traffic (Driving Instruction) Act 1984|public|13|12-04-1984|An Act to Amend Part V of the Road Traffic Act 1972.}} |- | {{|Anatomy Act 1984|public|14|24-05-1984|maintained=y|An Act to make provision about the use of bodies of deceased persons, and parts of such bodies, for anatomical examination and about the possession and disposal of bodies of deceased persons, and parts of such bodies, authorised to be used for anatomical examination, and for connected purposes.}} |- | {{|Law Reform (Husband and Wife) (Scotland) Act 1984|public|15|24-05-1984|maintained=y|An Act to amend the law relating to husband and wife and breach of promise of marriage and for connected purposes.}} |- | {{|Foreign Limitation Periods Act 1984|public|16|24-05-1984|maintained=y|An Act to provide for any law relating to the limitation of actions to be treated, for the purposes of cases in which effect is given to foreign law or to determinations by foreign courts, as a matter of substance rather than as a matter of procedure.}} |- | {{|Fosdyke Bridge Act 1984|public|17|24-05-1984|An Act to repeal certain provisions of the Fosdyke Bridge Transfer Act 1870.}} |- | {{|Tenants' Rights, Etc. (Scotland) (Amendment) Act 1984|public|18|24-05-1984|An Act to amend Parts I and II of the Tenants' Rights, Etc. (Scotland) Act 1980 with respect to the disposal of, and the rights of secure tenants of, dwelling-houses held by local authorities and certain other bodies in Scotland; and for connected purposes.}} |- | {{|Trade Marks (Amendment) Act 1984|public|19|24-05-1984|maintained=y|An Act to amend the Trade Marks Act 1938 to afford registration for service marks.}} |- | {{|Agriculture (Amendment) Act 1984|public|20|24-05-1984|maintained=y|An Act to enable grants under section 64 of the Agriculture Act 1967 towards fulfilling guarantees of bank loans to be made in relation to a wider range of co-operative marketing businesses; and to extend the powers of obtaining information conferred by subsection (1) of section 1 of the Agricultural Statistics Act 1979 and to repeal subsection (5) of that section.}} |- | {{|Somerset House Act 1984|public|21|26-06-1984|maintained=y|An Act to confer leasing powers on the Crown in respect of the Fine Rooms and other parts of Somerset House with a view to their use for artistic, cultural or other purposes.}} |- | {{|Public Health (Control of Disease) Act 1984|public|22|26-06-1984|maintained=y|An Act to consolidate certain enactments relating to the control of disease and to the establishment and functions of port health authorities, including enactments relating to burial and cremation and to the regulation of common lodging-houses and canal boats, with amendments to give effect to recommendations of the Law Commission.}} |- | {{|Registered Homes Act 1984|public|23|26-06-1984|maintained=y|An Act to consolidate certain enactments relating to residential care homes and nursing homes and Registered Homes Tribunals, with amendments to give effect to recommendations of the Law Commission.}} |- | {{|Dentists Act 1984|public|24|26-06-1984|maintained=y|An Act to consolidate the Dentists Acts 1957 to 1983, with an amendment to give effect to a recommendation of the Law Commission and the Scottish Law Commission.}} |- | {{|Betting, Gaming and Lotteries (Amendment) Act 1984|public|25|26-06-1984|maintained=y|An Act to amend the provisions of the Betting, Gaming and Lotteries Act 1963 in relation to the conduct and advertisement of licensed betting offices and to make provision for the alteration of the fees payable under paragraph 20 of Schedule 1 to that Act.}} |- | {{|Inshore Fishing (Scotland) Act 1984|public|26|26-06-1984|maintained=y|An Act to make fresh provision for Scotland as regards the regulation of inshore sea fishing, and for connected purposes.}} |- | {{|Road Traffic Regulation Act 1984|public|27|26-06-1984|maintained=y|An Act to consolidate the Road Traffic Regulation Act 1967 and certain related enactments, with amendments to give effect to recommendations of the Law Commission and the Scottish Law Commission.}} |- | {{|County Courts Act 1984|public|28|26-06-1984|maintained=y|An Act to consolidate certain enactments relating to county courts.}} |- | {{|Housing and Building Control Act 1984|public|29|26-06-1984|maintained=y|An Act to make further provision with respect to the disposal of, and the rights of secure tenants of, dwelling-houses held by local authorities and other bodies in England and Wales; to amend the law of England and Wales relating to the supervision of building work, the building regulations, sanitation and buildings and building control; and for connected purposes.}} |- | {{|Food Act 1984|public|30|26-06-1984|maintained=y|An Act to consolidate the provisions of the Food and Drugs Acts 1955 to 1982, the Sugar Act 1956, the Food and Drugs (Milk) Act 1970, section 7(3) and (4) of the European Communities Act 1972, section 198 of the Local Government Act 1972 and Part IX of the Local Government (Miscellaneous Provisions) Act 1982, and connected provisions.}} |- | {{|Rating and Valuation (Amendment) (Scotland) Act 1984|public|31|26-06-1984|maintained=y|An Act to amend the law of Scotland as regards rating, valuation and local government finance and for connected purposes.}} |- | {{|London Regional Transport Act 1984|public|32|26-06-1984|maintained=y|An Act to make provision with respect to transport in and around Greater London and for connected purposes.}} |- | {{|Rates Act 1984|public|33|26-06-1984|maintained=y|An Act to enable the Secretary of State to limit the rates made and precepts issued by local authorities; to require local authorities to consult representatives of industrial and commercial ratepayers before reaching decisions on expenditure and the means of financing it; to make provision for requiring additional information to be given to ratepayers; to require notice of the rates payable in respect of a dwelling-house to be given to any occupier not in receipt of a demand note; and to make other amendments relating to rates.}} |- | {{|Juries (Disqualification) Act 1984|public|34|12-07-1984|maintained=y|An Act to make further provision for disqualification for jury service on criminal grounds.}} |- | {{|Data Protection Act 1984|public|35|12-07-1984|maintained=y|An Act to regulate the use of automatically processed information relating to individuals and the provision of services in respect of such information.}} |- | {{|Mental Health (Scotland) Act 1984|public|36|12-07-1984|maintained=y|An Act to consolidate the Mental Health (Scotland) Act 1960.}} |- | {{|Child Abduction Act 1984|public|37|12-07-1984|maintained=y|An Act to amend the criminal law relating to the abduction of children.}} |- | {{|Cycle Tracks Act 1984|public|38|12-07-1984|maintained=y|An Act to amend the definition of "cycle track" in the Highways Act 1980 and to make further provision in relation to cycle tracks within the meaning of that Act.}} |- | {{|Video Recordings Act 1984|public|39|12-07-1984|maintained=y|An Act to make provision for regulating the distribution of video recordings and for connected purposes.}} |- | {{|Animal Health and Welfare Act 1984|public|40|12-07-1984|maintained=y|An Act to amend the provisions of the Animal Health Act 1981 relating to the seizure of things for the purpose of preventing the spread of disease, to powers of entry and declarations as to places infected with a disease and to enable certain orders under that Act to operate in or over territorial waters; to amend the Slaughter of Poultry Act 1967; to enable provision to be made for controlling the practice of artificial breeding of livestock; to repeal the Improvement of Live Stock (Licensing of Bulls) Act 1931 and the Horse Breeding Act 1958; to amend the Medicines Act 1968 in relation to feeding stuffs and veterinary drugs; and for connected purposes.}} |- | {{|Agricultural Holdings Act 1984|public|41|12-07-1984|An Act to amend the law with respect to agricultural holdings.}} |- | {{|Matrimonial and Family Proceedings Act 1984|public|42|12-07-1984|maintained=y|An Act to amend the Matrimonial Causes Act 1973 so far as it restricts the time within which proceedings for divorce or nullity of marriage can be instituted; to amend that Act, the Domestic Proceedings and Magistrates' Courts Act 1978 and the Magistrates' Courts Act 1980 so far as they relate to the exercise of the jurisdiction of courts in England and Wales to make provision for financial relief or to exercise related powers in matrimonial and certain other family proceedings; to make provision for financial relief to be available where a marriage has been dissolved or annulled, or the parties to a marriage have been legally separated, in a country overseas; to make related amendments in the Maintenance Orders (Reciprocal Enforcement) Act 1972 and the Inheritance (Provision for Family and Dependants) Act 1975; to make provision for the distribution and transfer between the High Court and county courts of, and the exercise in those courts of jurisdiction in, family business and family proceedings and to repeal and re-enact with amendments certain provisions conferring on designated county courts jurisdiction in matrimonial proceedings; to impose a duty to notify changes of address on persons liable to make payments under maintenance orders enforceable under Part II of the Maintenance Orders Act 1950 or Part I of the Maintenance Orders Act 1958; and for connected purposes.}} |- | {{|Finance Act 1984|public|43|26-07-1984|maintained=y|An Act to grant certain duties, to alter other duties, and to amend the law relating to the National Debt and the Public Revenue, and to make further provision in connection with Finance.}} |- | {{|Appropriation Act 1984|public|44|26-07-1984|An Act to apply a sum out of the Consolidated Fund to the service of the year ending on 31st March 1985, to appropriate the supplies granted in this Session of Parliament, and to repeal certain Consolidated Fund and Appropriation Acts.}} |- | {{|Prescription and Limitation (Scotland) Act 1984|public|45|26-07-1984|maintained=y|An Act to make new provision for Scotland with respect to the extinction of obligations to make contributions between wrongdoers; to amend the law relating to the time-limits for bringing actions which consist of or include a claim of damages in respect of personal injuries or a person's death; to make provision relating to the application of rules of law of a country other than Scotland in respect of the extinction of obligations or the limitation of time within which proceedings may be brought to enforce obligations; and for connected purposes.}} |- | {{|Cable and Broadcasting Act 1984|public|46|26-07-1984|maintained=y|An Act to provide for the establishment and functions of a Cable Authority and to make other provision with respect to cable programme services; to amend the Broadcasting Act 1981, to provide for the establishment and functions of a Satellite Broadcasting Board and to make other provision with respect to broadcasting services; and for connected purposes.}} |- | {{|Repatriation of Prisoners Act 1984|public|47|26-07-1984|maintained=y|An Act to make provision for facilitating the transfer between the United Kingdom and places outside the British Islands of persons for the time being detained in prisons, hospitals or other institutions by virtue of orders made in the course of the exercise by courts and tribunals of their criminal jurisdiction.}} |- | {{|Health and Social Security Act 1984|public|48|26-07-1984|maintained=y|An Act to amend the Opticians Act 1958; to make amendments of the National Health Service Act 1977 and the National Health Service (Scotland) Act 1978 in relation to general ophthalmic services, finance in the National Health Service and certain functions of the Secretary of State; to make amendments of the National Health Service Act 1977 in relation to Family Practitioner Committees; to make provision for the reimbursement of the cost of certain treatment in the European Economic Community; to amend the law relating to social security, statutory sick pay and contracted-out occupational pension schemes; and for connected purposes.}} |- | {{|Trade Union Act 1984|public|49|26-07-1984|maintained=y|An Act to make provision for election to certain positions in trade unions and with respect to ballots held in connection with strikes or other forms of industrial action; to require trade unions to compile and maintain registers of members' names and addresses; to amend the law relating to expenditure by trade unions and unincorporated employers' associations on political objects; and to amend sections 1 and 2 of the Employment Act 1980.}} |- | {{|Housing Defects Act 1984|public|50|31-07-1984|maintained=y|An Act to make provision in connection with defective dwellings disposed of by public sector authorities; and to provide for certain provisions in agreements between building societies to be disregarded for the purposes of the Restrictive Trade Practices Act 1976.}} |- | {{|Inheritance Tax Act 1984|note1= (Note: The original short title of the Inheritance Tax Act 1984 was the Capital Transfer Tax Act 1984, but this was amended by the Finance Act 1986 on 25 July 1986. At the same time, the term "capital transfer tax" in the long title was amended to "inheritance tax".)|public|51|31-07-1984|maintained=y|An Act to consolidate provisions of Part III of the Finance Act 1975 and other enactments relating to inheritance tax.}} |- | {{|Parliamentary Pensions etc. Act 1984|public|52|31-07-1984|maintained=y|An Act to make further provision with respect to the contributory pensions schemes for Members of the House of Commons and for the holders of certain Ministerial and other offices; to increase the amount that may be appropriated under section 4(4) of the House of Commons Members' Fund Act 1948 for the alleviation of special hardship; and to provide for payments to be made, in certain circumstances, to persons who cease to hold Ministerial and other offices or to be Representatives to the Assembly of the European Communities.}} |- | {{|Local Government (Interim Provisions) Act 1984|public|53|31-07-1984|maintained=y|An Act to make provision for the composition of the Greater London Council and metropolitan county councils pending a decision by Parliament on their continued existence; to establish a commission for safeguarding the interests of local government staff employed by or in the areas of those authorities; to require those authorities and their officers to furnish information in connection with proposals for the abolition of those authorities and the transfer of their functions; to postpone the exercise of certain functions by or in relation to those authorities; to control the general expenditure powers of, and disposals of land and contracts made by, those authorities; and to confer rights in respect of the accounts and finances of those authorities on London borough councils, the Common Council and metropolitan district councils.}} |- | {{|Roads (Scotland) Act 1984|public|54|31-10-1984|maintained=y|An Act to make provision as regards roads in Scotland; and for connected purposes.}} |- | {{|Building Act 1984|public|55|31-10-1984|maintained=y|An Act to consolidate certain enactments concerning building and buildings and related matters.}} |- | {{|Foster Children (Scotland) Act 1984|public|56|31-10-1984|maintained=y|An Act to consolidate certain enactments relating to foster children as they have effect in Scotland.}} |- | {{|Co-operative Development Agency and Industrial Development Act 1984|public|57|31-10-1984|maintained=y|An Act to amend the Co-operative Development Agency Act 1978 and confer power on the Secretary of State to dissolve the Agency; to amend the power in section 1 of the Industrial Development Act 1982 to designate assisted areas and to replace the provisions of Part II of that Act for the making of regional development grants.}} |- | {{|Rent (Scotland) Act 1984|public|58|31-10-1984|maintained=y|An Act to consolidate in relation to Scotland certain enactments relating to rents and tenants' rights and connected matters.}} |- | {{|Ordnance Factories and Military Services Act 1984|public|59|31-10-1984|maintained=y|An Act to make provision for the transfer to a company or companies of certain property, rights and liabilities to which Her Majesty or a Minister of the Crown is entitled or subject and which are attributable to the operations of the Royal Ordnance Factories; to make provision for the transfer of property, rights and liabilities to or from those and certain other companies; to make provision about their finances and about investment in them and their subsidiaries; to make provision for the extinguishment of certain liabilities concerning the Royal Ordnance Factories; to make provision about the powers of special constables in consequence of transfers; to make provision for the payment out of money provided by Parliament of certain sums required by the Secretary of State in relation to International Military Services Limited; and for connected purposes.}} |- | {{|Police and Criminal Evidence Act 1984|public|60|31-10-1984|maintained=y|An Act to make further provision in relation to the powers and duties of the police, persons in police detention, criminal evidence, police discipline and complaints against the police; to provide for arrangements for obtaining the views of the community on policing and for a rank of deputy chief constable; to amend the law relating to the Police Federations and Police Forces and Police Cadets in Scotland; and for connected purposes.}} }}

== Local acts ==
{{legislationuk|act |- | {{|Ashridge (Bonar Law Memorial) Trust Act 1983|local|7|26-07-1983|An Act to amend the Ashridge (Bonar Law Memorial) Trust Act 1954; and for other purposes.}} |- | {{|Associated British Ports Act 1983|local|8|26-07-1983|An Act to empower Associated British Ports to construct works and to acquire lands; to confer further powers on A.B. Ports; and for other purposes.}} |- | {{|Commons Registration (Glamorgan) Act 1983|local|9|26-07-1983|An Act to make provision for the validation of the registers of common land maintained under the Commons Registration Act 1965 by the former Glamorgan County Council and Merthyr Tydfil and Swansea County Borough Councils; and for other purposes.}} |- | {{|Tor Bay Harbour (Torquay Marina &c.) Act 1983|local|10|26-07-1983|An Act to authorise the council of the borough of Torbay to construct works in the harbour at Torquay; to make provision for moorings and the licensing thereof; to amend the Tor Bay Harbour Act 1970; and for other purposes.}} |- | {{|London Transport (Liverpool Street) Act 1983|local|11|26-07-1983|An Act to empower the London Transport Executive to acquire lands; to confer further powers on the Executive; and for other purposes.}} |- | {{|King's College London Act 1983|local|12|26-07-1983|An Act to reunite King's College Hospital Medical School (University of London) with King's College London; to transfer all rights, properties and liabilities from the School to the College; and for connected and other purposes.}} |- | {{|Lloyds Bowmaker Act 1983|local|13|27-10-1983|An Act to provide for the transfer to Lloyds Bowmaker Limited of the undertakings of certain subsidiaries of Lloyds and Scottish PLC; and for other purposes.}} |- | {{|Pwllheli Harbour Act 1983|local|14|01-12-1983|An Act to empower the Dwyfor District Council (Cyngor Dosbarth Dwyfor) to construct works at Pwllheli Harbour; to confer powers on them as the harbour authority for that harbour and for the provision of facilities therein; and for other purposes.}} |- | {{|Greater London Council (Money) Act 1983|local|15|01-12-1983|An Act to regulate prescribed expenditure and expenditure on lending to other persons by the Greater London Council, including prescribed expenditure of the London Transport Executive and their wholly-owned subsidiaries which is to be treated as prescribed expenditure of the Greater London Council, during the financial period from 1st April 1983 to 30th September 1984; and for other purposes.}} |- | {{|Severn-Trent Water Authority Act 1983|local|16|01-12-1983|maintained=y|An Act to provide for the improvement of land drainage and the relief of flooding in the valley of the river Soar; to authorise the Severn-Trent Water Authority to construct works and to acquire lands; to confer further powers on the Authority; and for other purposes.}} |- | {{|Standard Chartered Merchant Bank Act 1983|local|17|01-12-1983|An Act to provide for the vesting in MAIBL PLC of the undertaking of Standard Chartered Merchant Bank Limited; and for other purposes.}} |- | {{|Staffordshire Act 1983|local|18|21-12-1983|maintained=y|An Act to re-enact with amendments and to extend certain local enactments in force within the county of Staffordshire; to confer further powers on the Staffordshire County Council and local authorities in the county; to make further provision with regard to the environment, local government, improvement, health and finances of the county; to make further provision regarding the trusts respectively relating to the burgesses and the Silverdale lands of the borough of Newcastle-under-Lyme and the Coton Field Estate in the borough of Stafford; and for other purposes.}} |- | {{|Milford Haven Conservancy Act 1983|local|19|21-12-1983|An Act to repeal and re-enact with amendments the Milford Haven Conservancy Acts and Orders 1958 to 1980 and to make further provision with respect to the Milford Haven Conservancy Board; and for other purposes.}} |- | {{|Orkney Islands Council Order Confirmation Act 1984|local|1|13-03-1984|An Act to confirm a Provisional Order under the Private Legislation Procedure (Scotland) Act 1936, relating to Orkney Islands Council.|po1=Orkney Islands Council Order 1983|po1note1= (Note: Although passed in 1984, the short title specifies the year 1983.)|Provisional Order (as modified) to empower the Orkney Islands Council to operate an omnibus undertaking and to make better provision for the administration of the Orkney harbour areas.}} |- | {{|Western Isles Islands Council (Kallin Pier, Harbour Jurisdiction) Order Confirmation Act 1984|local|2|13-03-1984|An Act to confirm a Provisional Order under the Private Legislation Procedure (Scotland) Act 1936, relating to Western Isles Islands Council (Kallin Pier, Harbour Jurisdiction).|po1=Western Isles Islands Council (Kallin Pier, Harbour Jurisdiction) Order 1983|po1note1=|Provisional Order to confer on the Western Isles Islands Council harbour jurisdiction at Kallin on the Island of Grimsay; and for other purposes.}} |- | {{|Ullapool Harbour Order Confirmation Act 1984|local|3|13-03-1984|An Act to confirm a Provisional Order under the Private Legislation Procedure (Scotland) Act 1936, relating to Ullapool Harbour.|po1=Ullapool Harbour Order 1984|Provisional Order to change the name of the Ullapool Pier Trustees; to amend the constitution of the Trustees; and to authorise them to construct works; and for other purposes.}} |- | {{|London Docklands Railway Act 1984|local|4|12-04-1984|An Act to empower the London Transport Executive to construct works and to acquire lands; to confer further powers on the Executive; and for other purposes.}} |- | {{|Standard Chartered Bank Act 1984|local|5|12-04-1984|An Act to provide for the transfer to The Chartered Bank of the banking business of Standard Chartered Bank PLC; and for other purposes.}} |- | {{|Derwent Valley Railway Act 1984|local|6|24-05-1984|An Act to provide for the redemption of preference shares issued by the Derwent Valley Railway Company; for the reduction of the capital of the Company by the total nominal value of the shares so redeemed; for the variation of enactments relating to the Company; and for other purposes.}} |- | {{|British Railways Act 1984|local|7|24-05-1984|An Act to empower the British Railways Board to construct works and to purchase land; to extend the time for the compulsory purchase of certain land; to confer further powers on the Board and Sealink U.K. Limited; and for other purposes.}} |- | {{|The Metals Society Act 1984|local|8|24-05-1984|An Act to repeal The Metals Society Act 1973; and for other purposes.}} |- | {{|Epsom and Walton Downs Regulation Act 1984|local|9|24-05-1984|An Act to repeal and to re-enact with amendments the Epsom and Walton Downs Regulation Act 1936; to confer further powers on the Epsom and Walton Downs Conservators, United Racecourses Limited, the Horserace Betting Levy Board and the Epsom and Ewell Borough Council in respect of Epsom and Walton Downs regulated by that Act; and for other purposes.}} |- | {{|Barclays Bank Act 1984|local|10|26-06-1984|An Act to provide for the reorganisation of the Barclays group of companies by the transfer to Barclays Bank International Limited of the undertaking of Barclays Bank PLC; and for other purposes.}} |- | {{|Selby Bridge Act 1984|local|11|12-07-1984|An Act to modify the Transport Charges &c. (Miscellaneous Provisions) Act 1954 in its application to the bridge undertaking of the Company of Proprietors of Selby Bridge; to confer other powers on the Proprietors and to amend or repeal certain of the local statutory provisions applicable to them; and for other purposes.}} |- | {{|Swavesey Bye-ways Act 1984|local|12|12-07-1984|An Act to enable the South Cambridgeshire District Council to make financial provision for the maintenance of the Swavesey bye-ways and to raise a special charge on certain lands and on the Swavesey Parish Council for the payment of part of the costs incurred; to empower the Swavesey Parish Council to contribute towards the costs incurred and towards the costs of the promotion of the Bill for this Act; and for other purposes.}} |- | {{|Charing Cross and Westminster Medical School Act 1984|local|13|12-07-1984|An Act to dissolve the Charing Cross Hospital Medical School and the Westminster Medical School; to provide for the incorporation of the Charing Cross and Westminster Medical School; to transfer to that school all the rights, property and liabilities of the dissolved schools; and for other purposes.}} |- | {{|Anglian Water Authority (King's Lynn Tidal Defences) Act 1984|local|14|12-07-1984|An Act to authorise the Anglian Water Authority to construct works and to acquire lands; to confer further powers on the Anglian Water Authority; and for other purposes.}} |- | {{|Cardiff City Council Act 1984|local|15|12-07-1984|An Act to empower the Council of the city of Cardiff to construct works and to acquire lands; to confer further powers on the Council; and for other purposes.}} |- | {{|Shrewsbury and Atcham Borough Council Act 1984|local|16|26-07-1984|An Act to make provision for the regulation and protection of part of the Square in the borough of Shrewsbury and Atcham; and for other purposes.}} |- | {{|Dartford Tunnel Act 1984|local|17|26-07-1984|An Act to repeal the Dartford Tunnel Act 1967 and to re-enact certain provisions of that Act with amendments; to confer further powers in connection with the works authorised by that Act and by Acts repealed by that Act; and for other purposes.}} |- | {{|Portsea Harbour Company Act 1984|local|18|26-07-1984|An Act to vest a landing-place at Portsea in the city of Portsmouth in the Portsea Harbour Company Limited; to relieve Sealink U.K. Limited of all of their powers and obligations relating to the landing-place; to confer certain powers upon the harbour company to enable them to operate the landing-place as a public harbour undertaking; to make other provision for the regulation of the landing-place; and for other and connected purposes.}} |- | {{|Cornwall County Council Act 1984|local|19|26-07-1984|An Act to re-enact with amendments and to extend certain local enactments in force within the county of Cornwall; to make further provision in regard to the improvement, health and local government of that county; to confer further powers upon the local authorities of that county; and for other purposes.}} |- | {{|British Railways (No. 2) Act 1984|local|20|26-07-1984|An Act to empower the British Railways Board to construct works and to purchase land; to confer further powers on the Board and Sealink Harbours Limited; and for other purposes.}} |- | {{|County of Lancashire Act 1984|local|21|31-07-1984|An Act to re-enact with amendments and to extend certain local statutory provisions in force within the county of Lancashire; to confer further powers on the Lancashire County Council and local authorities in the county; to make further provision with respect to the improvement, health and local government of the county; and for other purposes.}} |- | {{|Aylesbury Vale District Council Act 1984|local|22|31-07-1984|An Act to make further provision in regard to the cattle market of the Aylesbury Vale District Council held in the former borough of Aylesbury; and for purposes connected therewith.}} |- | {{|Norwich City Council Act 1984|local|23|31-10-1984|An Act to re-enact with amendments and to extend certain local enactments in force within the city of Norwich; to confer further powers on the Council of the city of Norwich; to make further provision with regard to the regulation and maintenance of Mousehold Heath and to confer powers on the Mousehold Heath Conservators to conduct the regulation and maintenance thereof; to provide for the operation and control of markets and the environment; and for other purposes.}} |- | {{|Warwick District Council Act 1984|local|24|31-10-1984|An Act to re-enact with amendments certain local enactments in force within the district of Warwick; to confer further powers on the Warwick District Council; and for other purposes.}} |- | {{|London Transport Act 1984|local|25|31-10-1984|An Act to empower London Regional Transport to construct works and to acquire lands; to extend the time for the compulsory purchase of certain lands; to confer further powers on London Regional Transport; and for other purposes.}} |- | {{|Kingston upon Hull Act 1984|local|26|31-10-1984|maintained=y|An Act to re-enact with amendments certain local enactments in force within the city of Kingston upon Hull; to authorise the Kingston upon Hull City Council to construct works and to confer further powers on the Council; to make further provision with regard to the environment, local government, improvement, health and finances of the city; and for other purposes.}} |- | {{|Greater London Council (General Powers) Act 1984|local|27|31-10-1984|An Act to confer further powers upon the Greater London Council and other authorities; and for other purposes.}} }}
