= List of acts of the 4th session of the 44th Parliament of the United Kingdom =

This is a list of acts of the 4th session of the 44th Parliament of the United Kingdom, which ran from 28 October 1969 until 29 May 1970.

Acts passed since 1963 are cited by calendar year, as opposed to the convention used for earlier acts of citing the regnal year(s) in which the relevant parliamentary session was held. Each act passed in a respective year is given a chapter number (abbreviated "c."), denoted by Arabic numerals in the case of public general acts, lowercase Roman numerals in the case of local acts, or italicised Arabic numerals in the case of personal acts. These run as separate series.

85 acts of Parliament were passed by the 44th Parliament in its 4th session: 53 public general acts and 32 local acts.

indicates that an act is available to view at legislation.gov.uk, and indicates the location of the original act in the Parliamentary Archives.

== Public general acts ==
{{legislationuk|act |- | {{|Transport (London) Amendment Act 1969|public|60|11-12-1969|An Act to repeal certain provisions of section 19 of the Transport (London) Act 1969.}} |- | {{|Expiring Laws Act 1969|public|61|11-12-1969|An Act to make permanent certain expiring laws and continue others.}} |- | {{|Rent (Control of Increases) Act 1969|public|62|11-12-1969|An Act to limit increases in rents for local authority houses or payable under regulated tenancies.}} |- | {{|Police Act 1969|public|63|11-12-1969|maintained=y|An Act to enable assistance to be given to the Royal Ulster Constabulary by home police forces and empower the Parliament of Northern Ireland to enable assistance to be given to home police forces by the Royal Ulster Constabulary; to make provision in connection with the giving of assistance to home police forces by the Royal Ulster Constabulary; to establish a Police Council for the United Kingdom in place of the Police Council for Great Britain; and to enable certain police pensions regulations to be made with retrospective effect and alter the mode of exercising parliamentary control of the power to make them.}} |- | {{|Customs (Import Deposits) Act 1969|public|64|11-12-1969|An Act to extend for one year the period for which the duty imposed by the Customs (Import Deposits) Act 1968 may remain in force subject to the like exemptions and reliefs as were provided for by that Act, but to reduce the amount of that duty from fifty per cent. to forty per cent. of the value of the goods on which it is charged.}} |- | {{|Ulster Defence Regiment Act 1969|public|65|18-12-1969|An Act to establish the Ulster Defence Regiment and for purposes connected therewith.}} |- | {{|Consolidated Fund Act 1970|public|1|29-01-1970|An Act to apply certain sums out of the Consolidated Fund to the service of the years ending on 31st March 1970 and 1971.}} |- | {{|Industrial Development (Ships) Act 1970|public|2|29-01-1970|maintained=y|An Act to restrict the power of the Minister of Technology to make grants under section 5(1) of the Industrial Development Act 1966 and enable the Parliament of Northern Ireland to restrict, by reference to certain matters, the power of the Ministry of Commerce for Northern Ireland to make grants under section 6(1) of the Industrial Investment (General Assistance) Act (Northern Ireland) 1966.}} |- | {{|Food and Drugs (Milk) Act 1970|public|3|29-01-1970|An Act to authorise the treatment of milk by the application of steam.}} |- | {{|Valuation for Rating (Scotland) Act 1970|public|4|26-02-1970|maintained=y|An Act to make provision with respect to the partial derating of buildings and associated land in Scotland used for the purpose of the keeping or breeding of livestock.}} |- | {{|Housing (Amendment) (Scotland) Act 1970|public|5|26-02-1970|An Act to amend section 25(1) of the Housing (Financial Provisions) (Scotland) Act 1968.}} |- | {{|Rural Water Supplies and Sewerage (Scotland) Act 1970|public|6|26-02-1970|maintained=y|An Act to increase the limit on the contributions payable to local authorities in Scotland under the Rural Water Supplies and Sewerage Act 1944.}} |- | {{|Local Employment Act 1970|public|7|26-02-1970|maintained=y|An Act to provide for the exercise, in relation to intermediate areas, of certain of the functions under the Local Employment Acts 1960 to 1966 of the Minister of Technology and other persons and, in relation to derelict land clearance areas, of the powers conferred by section 20 of the Industrial Development Act 1966; to provide for the making of grants out of moneys provided by Parliament towards costs incurred by councils in connection with the bringing into use, or the improvement of the appearance of, derelict, neglected or unsightly land; to withdraw the payments additional to refund of selective employment tax which are made under section 1(1)(a) to (d) of the Selective Employment Payments Act 1966, and to reduce correspondingly the amount of payments to public bodies under section 3 of that Act; to amend section 60 of the Landlord and Tenant Act 1954; and for purposes connected with the matters aforesaid.}} |- | {{|Insolvency Services (Accounting and Investment) Act 1970|public|8|26-02-1970|An Act to amend the law with respect to the Bankruptcy Estates Account and the Companies Liquidation Account and the investment of balances therein, and with respect to the fixing and disposal of fees in bankruptcy and winding-up proceedings; and for purposes connected with those matters.}} |- | {{|Taxes Management Act 1970|public|9|12-03-1970|maintained=y|An Act to consolidate certain of the enactments relating to income tax, capital gains tax and corporation tax, including certain enactments relating also to other taxes.}} |- | {{|Income and Corporation Taxes Act 1970|public|10|12-03-1970|maintained=y|An Act to consolidate certain of the enactments relating to income tax and corporation tax, including certain enactments relating also to other taxes.}} |- | {{|Sea Fish Industry Act 1970|public|11|12-03-1970|maintained=y|An Act to consolidate certain enactments relating to the sea fishing industry and to repeal certain obsolete enactments relating to herring.}} |- | {{|Consolidated Fund (No. 2) Act 1970|public|12|24-03-1970|An Act to apply certain sums out of the Consolidated Fund to the service of the years ending on 31st March 1969, 1970 and 1971.}} |- | {{|Game Act 1970|public|13|26-03-1970|maintained=y|An Act to amend the Game Act 1831; and to repeal section 10 of the Revenue Act 1911.}} |- | {{|Education (School Milk) Act 1970|public|14|26-03-1970|An Act to include among the children for whom school milk is to be provided junior pupils at schools designated as secondary schools under section 1 of the Education Act 1964.}} |- | {{|Export Guarantees and Payments Act 1970|public|15|16-04-1970|An Act to amend the Export Guarantees Act 1968, and to confer on the Board of Trade power to make grants for the purpose of reducing costs incurred or to be incurred, under export contracts or contracts related to export contracts, by persons carrying on business or other activities abroad.}} |- | {{|National Health Service Contributions Act 1970|public|16|15-05-1970|An Act to increase contributions payable by employers under the National Health Service Contributions Act 1965.}} |- | {{|Proceedings Against Estates Act 1970|public|17|15-05-1970|An Act to repeal section 1(3) of the Law Reform (Miscellaneous Provisions) Act 1934 and to make provision for facilitating proceedings against the estates of deceased persons.}} |- | {{|Guyana Republic Act 1970|public|18|15-05-1970|maintained=y|An Act to make provision as to the operation of the law in relation to Guyana as a republic within the Commonwealth.}} |- | {{|General Rate Act 1970|public|19|15-05-1970|An Act to make provision as to the assessment of dwelling-houses for the purposes of valuation lists under the General Rate Act 1967 by reference to evidence as to the rents at which other dwelling-houses have been let or as to the relationship between those rents and the gross values of those other dwelling-houses in the current valuation lists.}} |- | {{|Roads (Scotland) Act 1970|public|20|15-05-1970|An Act to make certain amendments to the law relating to roads and streets in Scotland, and to provide for the use of appliances or vehicles on footways and footpaths for certain purposes.}} |- | {{|New Forest Act 1970|public|21|15-05-1970|maintained=y|An Act to make further provision for the New Forest.}} |- | {{|Tonga Act 1970|public|22|15-05-1970|maintained=y|An Act to make provision in connection with the attainment by Tonga of fully responsible status within the Commonwealth.}} |- | {{|Road Traffic (Disqualification) Act 1970|public|23|15-05-1970|An Act to amend the law relating to disqualification for the offence of driving while disqualified.}} |- | {{|Finance Act 1970|public|24|29-05-1970|maintained=y|An Act to grant certain duties, to alter other duties, and to amend the law relating to the National Debt and the Public Revenue, and to make further provision in connection with Finance.}} |- | {{|Appropriation Act 1970|public|25|29-05-1970|An Act to apply a sum out of the Consolidated Fund to the service of the year ending on 31st March 1971, and to appropriate the supplies granted in this Session of Parliament.}} |- | {{|Films Act 1970|public|26|29-05-1970|maintained=y|An Act to amend the enactments relating to the financing and exhibition of films.}} |- | {{|Fishing Vessels (Safety Provisions) Act 1970|public|27|29-05-1970|maintained=y|An Act to make further provision for the safety of fishing vessels.}} |- | {{|Local Government (Footpaths and Open Spaces) (Scotland) Act 1970|public|28|29-05-1970|maintained=y|An Act to confer on local authorities in Scotland power to take over the control and maintenance of certain footpaths, and to construct and maintain certain footpaths; to authorise local authorities in Scotland to acquire or maintain certain open spaces; and for connected purposes.}} |- | {{|Parish Councils and Burial Authorities (Miscellaneous Provisions) Act 1970|public|29|29-05-1970|maintained=y|An Act to amend the law relating to the provision by parish councils of signs and the administration of burial grounds by burial authorities, and for matters connected therewith.}} |- | {{|Conservation of Seals Act 1970|public|30|29-05-1970|maintained=y|An Act to provide for the protection and conservation of seals in England and Wales and Scotland and in the adjacent territorial waters.}} |- | {{|Administration of Justice Act 1970|public|31|29-05-1970|maintained=y|An Act to make further provision about the courts (including assizes), their business, jurisdiction and procedure; to enable a High Court judge to accept appointment as arbitrator or umpire under an arbitration agreement; to amend the law respecting the enforcement of debt and other liabilities; to amend section 106 of the Rent Act 1968; and for miscellaneous purposes connected with the administration of justice.}} |- | {{|Riding Establishments Act 1970|public|32|29-05-1970|maintained=y|An Act to confer further powers on local authorities with respect to the licensing of riding establishments and to amend the Riding Establishments Act 1964.}} |- | {{|Law Reform (Miscellaneous Provisions) Act 1970|public|33|29-05-1970|maintained=y|An Act to abolish actions for breach of promise of marriage and make provision with respect to the property of, and gifts between, persons who have been engaged to marry; to abolish the right of a husband to claim damages for adultery with his wife; to abolish actions for the enticement or harbouring of a spouse, or for the enticement, seduction or harbouring of a child; to make provision with respect to the maintenance of survivors of void marriages; and for purposes connected with the matters aforesaid.}} |- | {{|Marriage (Registrar General's Licence) Act 1970|public|34|29-05-1970|maintained=y|An Act to permit marriages on unregistered premises; and for purposes connected therewith.}} |- | {{|Conveyancing and Feudal Reform (Scotland) Act 1970|public|35|29-05-1970|maintained=y|An Act to provide as respects Scotland for the variation and discharge of certain obligations relating to land; to facilitate the allocation of feuduties and ground annuals; to reduce the period of positive prescription of 20 years to 10 years; to provide for a new form of heritable security; to make certain amendments to the existing law relating to heritable securities; to make certain other amendments to the law relating to conveyancing; to abolish the rights of pre-emption of heritors in respect of glebes; to amend the Lands Tribunal Act 1949; and for connected purposes.}} |- | {{|Merchant Shipping Act 1970|public|36|29-05-1970|maintained=y|An Act to make fresh provision in place of certain enactments relating to merchant ships and seamen and to repeal some of those enactments without replacement; to make further provision relating to merchant ships and seamen; and for purposes connected therewith.}} |- | {{|Republic of The Gambia Act 1970|public|37|29-05-1970|maintained=y|An Act to make provision in connection with The Gambia becoming a republic within the Commonwealth.}} |- | {{|Building (Scotland) Act 1970|public|38|29-05-1970|maintained=y|An Act to Amend the Building (Scotland) Act 1959, and for purposes connected therewith.}} |- | {{|Local Authorities (Goods and Services) Act 1970|public|39|29-05-1970|maintained=y|An Act to make further provision with respect to the supply of goods and services by local authorities to certain public bodies, and for purposes connected therewith.}} |- | {{|Agriculture Act 1970|public|40|29-05-1970|maintained=y|An Act to make provision with respect to agriculture and related matters and with respect to flood warning systems; and to amend the Diseases of Animals Act 1950.}} |- | {{|Equal Pay Act 1970|public|41|29-05-1970|maintained=y|An Act to prevent discrimination, as regards terms and conditions of employment, between men and women.}} |- | {{|Local Authority Social Services Act 1970|public|42|29-05-1970|maintained=y|An Act to make further provision with respect to the organisation, management and administration of local authority social services; to amend the Health Visiting and Social Work (Training) Act 1962; and for connected purposes.}} |- | {{|Trees Act 1970|public|43|29-05-1970|maintained=y|An Act to amend the law relating to the making of tree preservation orders and the grant of felling licences.}} |- | {{|Chronically Sick and Disabled Persons Act 1970|public|44|29-05-1970|maintained=y|An Act to make further provision with respect to the welfare of chronically sick and disabled persons; and for connected purposes.}} |- | {{|Matrimonial Proceedings and Property Act 1970|public|45|29-05-1970|maintained=y|An Act to make fresh provision for empowering the court in matrimonial proceedings to make orders ordering either spouse to make financial provision for, or transfer property to, the other spouse or a child of the family, orders for the variation of ante-nuptial and post-nuptial settlements, orders for the custody and education of children and orders varying, discharging or suspending orders made in such proceedings; to make other amendments of the law relating to matrimonial proceedings; to abolish the right to claim restitution of conjugal rights; to declare what interest in property is acquired by a spouse who contributes to its improvement; to make provision as to a spouse's rights of occupation under section 1 of the Matrimonial Homes Act 1967 in certain cases; to extend section 17 of the Married Women's Property Act 1882 and section 7 of the Matrimonial Causes (Property and Maintenance) Act 1958; to amend the law about the property of a person whose marriage is the subject of a decree of judicial separation dying intestate; to abolish the agency of necessity of a wife; and for purposes connected with the matters aforesaid.}} |- | {{|Radiological Protection Act 1970|public|46|29-05-1970|maintained=y|An Act to provide for the establishment of a National Radiological Protection Board and an Advisory Committee, with functions concerning the protection of people from radiation hazards; and for connected purposes.}} |- | {{|Indecent Advertisements (Amendment) Act 1970|public|47|29-05-1970|An Act to amend the Indecent Advertisements Act 1889.}} }}

== Local acts ==
{{legislationuk|act |- | {{|Glasgow Corporation Order Confirmation Act 1969|local|61|11-12-1969|An Act to confirm a Provisional Order under the Private Legislation Procedure (Scotland) Act 1936, relating to Glasgow Corporation.|po1=Glasgow Corporation Order 1969|Provisional Order to make further provision for the policing of Glasgow Airport; to make further provision with respect to the finances and local government of the city of Glasgow; and for other purposes.}} |- | {{|Edinburgh Corporation Order Confirmation Act 1969|local|62|11-12-1969|An Act to confirm a Provisional Order under the Private Legislation Procedure (Scotland) Act 1936, relating to Edinburgh Corporation.|po1=Edinburgh Corporation Order 1969|Provisional Order to confer powers on the Corporation of the city of Edinburgh with respect to the provision and sale of refreshments at their Meadowbank Sports Centre and other premises; to amend the Edinburgh Corporation Orders 1964 and 1967; and for other purposes.}} |- | {{|Glasgow Corporation Order Confirmation Act 1970|local|1|26-02-1970|An Act to confirm a Provisional Order under the Private Legislation Procedure (Scotland) Act 1936, relating to Glasgow Corporation.|po1=Glasgow Corporation Order 1970|Provisional Order to confer on the Corporation of the city of Glasgow powers to acquire lands and to construct works; to remove restrictions on the provision by the Corporation of parking places in buildings used for other purposes; to make further provision with respect to the local government of the city; and for other purposes.}} |- | {{|Regent, Royal and Carlton Terrace Gardens, Edinburgh Order Confirmation Act 1970|local|2|15-05-1970|An Act to confirm a Provisional Order under the Private Legislation Procedure (Scotland) Act 1936, relating to Regent, Royal and Carlton Terrace Gardens, Edinburgh.|po1=Regent, Royal and Carlton Terrace Gardens, Edinburgh Order 1970|Provisional Order to amend the provisions of a contract of feu relating to the Regent, Royal and Carlton Terrace Gardens, Edinburgh, with respect to annual assessments and admissions to the gardens; and for other purposes.}} |- | {{|Royal Bank of Scotland Order Confirmation Act 1970|local|3|15-05-1970|An Act to confirm a Provisional Order under the Private Legislation Procedure (Scotland) Act 1936, relating to the Royal Bank of Scotland.|po1=Royal Bank of Scotland Order 1970|Provisional Order to repeal certain provisions of the Royal Charters granted to The Royal Bank of Scotland; to repeal the Royal Bank of Scotland Acts 1873 to 1968; to confer powers on The Royal Bank of Scotland Limited with respect to the carrying on of its business and the regulation of its affairs; and to confirm certain parts of an Interlocutor of the Court of Session dated 21st March, 1969; and for other purposes.}} |- | {{|Basingstoke Corporation Act 1970|local|4|15-05-1970|An Act to confer powers upon the mayor, aldermen and burgesses of the borough of Basingstoke with regard to the raising of money; and for other purposes.}} |- | {{|Australia and New Zealand Banking Group Act 1970|local|5|15-05-1970|An Act to provide for the transfer to Australia and New Zealand Banking Group Limited of the undertakings of Australia and New Zealand Bank Limited and The English, Scottish and Australian Bank, Limited and for other purposes incidental thereto and consequential thereon and to provide for the incorporation of Australia and New Zealand Savings Bank Limited in the State of Victoria in the Commonwealth of Australia, for the cesser of application to that company of provisions of the Companies Acts 1948 to 1967 consequent upon such incorporation; and for other purposes incidental thereto.}} |- | {{|Warwickshire County Council Act 1970|local|6|15-05-1970|An Act to confer further powers on the Warwickshire County Council in relation to the finances of the county; and for other purposes.}} |- | {{|Welland and Nene (Empingham Reservoir) and Mid-Northamptonshire Water Act 1970|local|7|15-05-1970|An Act to provide for the conservation of the water resources of the area of the Welland and Nene River Authority by the construction of a reservoir and other waterworks by the Authority; to authorise the Mid-Northamptonshire Water Board to construct waterworks; to authorise the Welland and Nene River Authority and the Mid-Northamptonshire Water Board to acquire lands and rights; to confer further powers on the Mid-Northamptonshire Water Board with regard to their water undertaking, including increased charging powers; and for other purposes.}} |- | {{|Doncaster Corporation Act 1970|local|8|15-05-1970|An Act to confer further powers on the mayor, aldermen and burgesses of the county borough of Doncaster in relation to the finances of the borough; and for other purposes.}} |- | {{|Newport Corporation Act 1970|local|9|15-05-1970|An Act to confer further powers on the mayor, aldermen and burgesses of the county borough of Newport in relation to the finances of the county borough; and for other purposes.}} |- | {{|Huddersfield Corporation Act 1970|local|10|15-05-1970|An Act to confer further powers on the mayor, aldermen and burgesses of the borough of Huddersfield in relation to the superannuation fund maintained by the said mayor, aldermen and burgesses and in relation to the finances of that borough; and for other purposes.}} |- | {{|Bolton Corporation Act 1970|local|11|15-05-1970|An Act to confer further powers on the mayor, aldermen and burgesses of the county borough of Bolton in relation to the finances of the borough; to make further provision for the local government and improvement of the borough; and for other purposes.}} |- | {{|Hampshire County Council Act 1970|local|12|15-05-1970|An Act to confer further powers on the Hampshire County Council in relation to the finances of the administrative county of Hampshire; and for other purposes.}} |- | {{|Havering Corporation Act 1970|local|13|15-05-1970|An Act to confer further powers on the mayor, aldermen and burgesses of the London borough of Havering in relation to the development of land; and for other purposes.}} |- | {{|Leicestershire County Council Act 1970|local|14|15-05-1970|An Act to make further provision for the finances and local government of the administrative county of Leicestershire; and for other purposes.}} |- | {{|Swansea Corporation Act 1970|local|15|15-05-1970|An Act to confer further powers on the mayor, aldermen and citizens of the city of Swansea in relation to the finances of the city; and for other purposes.}} |- | {{|Barclays Bank D.C.O. Act 1970|local|16|15-05-1970|An Act to increase the maximum permitted capital of Barclays Bank D.C.O.; and for other purposes.}} |- | {{|Wallasey Corporation Act 1970|local|17|15-05-1970|An Act to confer further powers on the mayor, aldermen and burgesses of the borough of Wallasey in relation to the superannuation fund maintained by the said mayor, aldermen and burgesses and in relation to the finances of that borough; and for other purposes.}} |- | {{|Flintshire County Council Act 1970|local|18|15-05-1970|An Act to confer further powers on the Flintshire County Council in relation to lands and finance; and for other purposes.}} |- | {{|British Transport Docks Order Confirmation Act 1970|local|19|29-05-1970|An Act to confirm a Provisional Order under the Private Legislation Procedure (Scotland) Act 1936, relating to British Transport Docks.|po1=British Transport Docks Order 1970|Provisional Order to transfer certain statutory obligations and liabilities of the British Transport Docks Board in relation to Tayport harbour to James Donaldson and Sons Limited.}} |- | {{|Coatbridge Burgh Order Confirmation Act 1970|local|20|29-05-1970|An Act to confirm a Provisional Order under the Private Legislation Procedure (Scotland) Act 1936, relating to Coatbridge Burgh.|po1=Coatbridge Burgh Order 1970|Provisional Order to confer further powers on the Town Council of the burgh of Coatbridge with respect to the borrowing of money and the finances of the said burgh.}} |- | {{|Somerset County Council Act 1970|local|21|29-05-1970|An Act to confer further powers on the Somerset County Council in relation to finance and land; and for other purposes.}} |- | {{|Birmingham Corporation Act 1970|local|22|29-05-1970|An Act to confer powers upon the lord mayor, aldermen and citizens of the city of Birmingham with regard to finance and local government; and for other purposes.}} |- | {{|Gosport Corporation Act 1970|local|23|29-05-1970|An Act to confer further powers upon the mayor, aldermen and burgesses of the borough of Gosport; to make further provision for the improvement, local government and finance of the borough; and for other purposes.}} |- | {{|Huntingdon and Peterborough County Council Act 1970|local|24|29-05-1970|An Act to confer further powers on the Huntingdon and Peterborough County Council and on local authorities in the administrative county of Huntingdon and Peterborough in relation to lands and highways and the local government, improvement, health and finances of the county; and for other purposes.}} |- | {{|West Riding County Council Act 1970|local|25|29-05-1970|An Act to confer further powers on the West Riding County Council in relation to lands and finances of the administrative county of the West Riding of Yorkshire; and for other purposes.}} |- | {{|Hambros Bank Act 1970|local|26|29-05-1970|An Act to provide for the transfer to Hambros Limited of the banking business of Hambros Bank, Limited; and for other purposes.}} |- | {{|Norwich Corporation Act 1970|local|27|29-05-1970|An Act to confer further powers on the lord mayor, aldermen and citizens of the city of Norwich; to empower them to establish an undertaking for the supply of heat; to make further provision for the improvement, health, local government and finances of the city; and for other purposes.}} |- | {{|Hooker Estates Limited (Transfer of Registration) Act 1970|local|28|29-05-1970|An Act to make provision for the transfer to the State of New South Wales in the Commonwealth of Australia of the registered office of Hooker Estates Limited; for the cesser of application to that company of provisions of the Companies Acts 1948 to 1967; and for other purposes incidental thereto.}} |- | {{|Stoke-on-Trent Corporation Act 1970|local|29|29-05-1970|An Act to confer further powers on the lord mayor, aldermen and citizens of the city of Stoke-on-Trent in relation to the finances of the city; and for other purposes.}} |- | {{|Southampton Corporation Act 1970|local|30|29-05-1970|An Act to confer further powers on the mayor, aldermen and citizens of the city and county of the city of Southampton with regard to finance; to make further provision for the investment of moneys forming part of the superannuation fund maintained by them; and for other purposes.}} }}
