= List of acts of the 3rd session of the 47th Parliament of the United Kingdom =

This is a list of acts of the 3rd session of the 47th Parliament of the United Kingdom, which ran from 24 November 1976 until 26 October 1977.

Acts passed since 1963 are cited by calendar year, as opposed to the convention used for earlier acts of citing the regnal year(s) in which the relevant parliamentary session was held. Each act passed in a respective year is given a chapter number (abbreviated "c."), denoted by Arabic numerals in the case of public general acts, lowercase Roman numerals in the case of local acts, or italicised Arabic numerals in the case of personal acts. These run as separate series.

74 acts of Parliament were passed by the 47th Parliament in its 3rd session: 53 public general acts and 21 local acts.

indicates that an act is available to view at legislation.gov.uk, and indicates the location of the original act in the Parliamentary Archives.

== Public general acts ==
{{legislationuk|act |- | {{|Consolidated Fund (No. 2) Act 1976|public|84|22-12-1976|An Act to apply certain sums out of the Consolidated Fund to the service of the years ending on 31st March 1977 and 1978.}} |- | {{|National Insurance Surcharge Act 1976|public|85|22-12-1976|An Act to impose a surcharge, payable into the Consolidated Fund, on secondary Class 1 contributions under the Social Security Act 1975 and the Social Security (Northern Ireland) Act 1975.}} |- | {{|Fishery Limits Act 1976|public|86|22-12-1976|maintained=y|An Act to extend British fishery limits and make further provision in connection with the regulation of sea fishing.}} |- | {{|Consolidated Fund Act 1977|public|1|17-03-1977|An Act to apply certain sums out of the Consolidated Fund to the service of the years ending on 31st March 1976 and 1977.}} |- | {{|Covent Garden Market (Financial Provisions) Act 1977|public|2|17-03-1977|An Act to make fresh provision in relation to the finances and the financial duties of the Covent Garden Market Authority and for related purposes.}} |- | {{|Aircraft and Shipbuilding Industries Act 1977|public|3|17-03-1977|maintained=y|An Act to provide for the establishment of two bodies corporate to be called British Aerospace and British Shipbuilders, and to make provision with respect to their functions; to provide for the vesting in British Aerospace of the securities of certain companies engaged in manufacturing aircraft and guided weapons and the vesting in British Shipbuilders of the securities of certain companies engaged in shipbuilding and allied industries; to make provision for the vesting in those companies of certain property, rights and liabilities; to provide for payments to British Aerospace and its wholly owned subsidiaries, for the purpose of promoting the design, development and production of civil aircraft; and for connected purposes.}} |- | {{|Roe Deer (Close Seasons) Act 1977|public|4|17-03-1977|maintained=y|An Act to Amend the Deer Act 1963 with respect to close seasons for roe deer.}} |- | {{|Social Security (Miscellaneous Provisions) Act 1977|public|5|30-03-1977|maintained=y|An Act to amend the law relating to social security and to regulate the manner of providing for certain benefits connected with service in the armed forces.}} |- | {{|International Finance, Trade and Aid Act 1977|public|6|30-03-1977|An Act to make provision for the payment of further subscriptions to the International Monetary Fund and for raising the limit on loans under the International Monetary Fund Act 1962; to enable effect to be given to certain amendments of the Articles of Agreement of that Fund; to amend the Export Guarantees Act 1975; to make further provision about the finances of the Commonwealth Development Corporation; to amend section 2 of the Overseas Aid Act 1968; and for purposes connected therewith.}} |- | {{|Nuclear Industry (Finance) Act 1977|public|7|30-03-1977|maintained=y|An Act to make further financial provision for and in respect of British Nuclear Fuels Limited, The Radiochemical Centre Limited and the National Nuclear Corporation Limited.}} |- | {{|Job Release Act 1977|public|8|30-03-1977|maintained=y|An Act to provide finance for job release schemes; and for a connected purpose.}} |- | {{|Representation of the People Act 1977|public|9|30-03-1977|An Act to increase the limits on candidates' election expenses at local government elections in the United Kingdom.}} |- | {{|Town and Country Planning (Scotland) Act 1977|public|10|30-03-1977|maintained=y|An Act to amend the Town and Country Planning (Scotland) Act 1972 in relation to the preparation and adoption of local plans and stop notices; to amend Part IX of the Local Government (Scotland) Act 1973 to provide for appeals against decisions of regional planning authorities on applications for planning permission referred to them; and for connected purposes.}} |- | {{|General Rate (Public Utilities) Act 1977|public|11|30-03-1977|An Act to make retrospective provision as respects orders made or having effect under section 35 of the General Rate Act 1967, and as respects the rateable value of gas hereditaments for the year 1976–77, to grant an indemnity for acts done in conformity with provision so made, and to make consequential and minor amendments of the law relating to the rating of public utilities and other bodies.}} |- | {{|Agricultural Holdings (Notices to Quit) Act 1977|public|12|30-03-1977|An Act to consolidate sections 23 to 33 of the Agricultural Holdings Act 1948 and certain other enactments relating to notices to quit agricultural holdings in England and Wales and related notices.}} |- | {{|British Airways Board Act 1977|public|13|30-03-1977|An Act to consolidate Part III and Schedule 8 of the Civil Aviation Act 1971 and certain enactments in Part IV of that Act and the Air Corporations Act 1967 and certain provisions of the Air Corporations (Dissolution) Order 1973 with corrections and minor improvements made under the Consolidation of Enactments (Procedure) Act 1949.}} |- | {{|Returning Officers (Scotland) Act 1977|public|14|26-05-1977|An Act to make provision as respects Scotland regarding returning officers for parliamentary elections, the staff of such officers, and for connected purposes.}} |- | {{|Marriage (Scotland) Act 1977|public|15|26-05-1977|maintained=y|An Act to make new provision for Scotland as respects the law relating to the constitution of marriage, and for connected purposes.}} |- | {{|New Towns (Scotland) Act 1977|public|16|26-05-1977|maintained=y|An Act to make provision as respects the revocation or variation of orders made under section 1, 2 or 5(1) of the New Towns (Scotland) Act 1968; and for connected purposes.}} |- | {{|Rent (Agriculture) Amendment Act 1977|public|17|26-05-1977|maintained=y|An Act to impose time limits on the duty of housing authorities to notify their decisions on applications under section 27 of the Rent (Agriculture) Act 1976.}} |- | {{|Statute Law (Repeals) Act 1977|public|18|16-06-1977|maintained=y|An Act to promote the reform of the statute law by the repeal, in accordance with recommendations of the Law Commission and the Scottish Law Commission, of certain enactments which (except in so far as their effect is preserved) are no longer of practical utility; and to facilitate the citation of statutes.}} |- | {{|Restrictive Trade Practices Act 1977|public|19|30-06-1977|maintained=y|An Act to provide for the disregard of certain matters in determining whether an agreement is one to which the Restrictive Trade Practices Act 1976 applies; and for connected purposes.}} |- | {{|Transport (Financial Provisions) Act 1977|public|20|30-06-1977|maintained=y|An Act to provide for grants to the British Railways Board and the National Freight Corporation; to increase the borrowing powers of the British Waterways Board; and for connected purposes.}} |- | {{|Passenger Vehicles (Experimental Areas) Act 1977|public|21|22-07-1977|An Act to enable the requirements of Part III of the Road Traffic Act 1960 and other requirements applying to or in connection with public service vehicles to be modified in relation to areas designated as experimental areas by the Secretary of State.}} |- | {{|Redundancy Rebates Act 1977|public|22|22-07-1977|An Act to make provision for varying the amounts of rebates payable under section 30 of the Redundancy Payments Act 1965 and section 40 of the Contracts of Employment and Redundancy Payments Act (Northern Ireland) 1965.}} |- | {{|New Towns Act 1977|public|23|22-07-1977|An Act to increase the limit imposed by section 43 of the New Towns Act 1965 on the amounts which may be borrowed by development corporations and the Commission for the New Towns.}} |- | {{|Merchant Shipping (Safety Convention) Act 1977|public|24|22-07-1977|note3= (Note: The Queen's Printer edition erroneously states that Royal Assent was given on 23 July 1977, but the Journals of the House of Commons confirm that it was in fact given on 22 July.)|maintained=y|An Act to enable effect to be given to the International Convention for the Safety of Life at Sea signed in London on 1st November 1974, and for purposes connected therewith.}} |- | {{|Minibus Act 1977|public|25|22-07-1977|An Act to make provision for the use of certain motor vehicles by bodies concerned with education, with religion, with social welfare or with other activities for the benefit of the community; and for purposes connected therewith.}} |- | {{|Licensing (Amendment) Act 1977|public|26|22-07-1977|maintained=y|An Act to amend section 186 of the Licensing Act 1964.}} |- | {{|Presumption of Death (Scotland) Act 1977|public|27|22-07-1977|maintained=y|An Act to make fresh provision in the law of Scotland in relation to the presumed death of missing persons; and for connected purposes.}} |- | {{|Control of Food Premises (Scotland) Act 1977|public|28|22-07-1977|An Act to prohibit as respects Scotland the sale etc. of food in circumstances where there is a likely danger to health.}} |- | {{|Town and Country Planning (Amendment) Act 1977|public|29|22-07-1977|An Act to amend the Town and Country Planning Act 1971 as respects stop notices and the provision of information to the Secretary of State and local authorities; and for connected purposes.}} |- | {{|Rentcharges Act 1977|public|30|22-07-1977|maintained=y|An Act to prohibit the creation, and provide for the extinguishment, apportionment and redemption, of certain rentcharges.}} |- | {{|Farriers (Registration) (Amendment) Act 1977|public|31|22-07-1977|maintained=y|An Act to amend the provisions of the Farriers (Registration) Act 1975 with respect to the qualifications for registration thereunder; and for other purposes.}} |- | {{|Torts (Interference with Goods) Act 1977|public|32|22-07-1977|maintained=y|An Act to amend the law concerning conversion and other torts affecting goods.}} |- | {{|Price Commission Act 1977|public|33|22-07-1977|maintained=y|An Act to make further provision about the Price Commission and prices and charges, and to amend the Counter-Inflation Act 1973 and the Remuneration, Charges and Grants Act 1975.}} |- | {{|Northern Ireland (Emergency Provisions) (Amendment) Act 1977|public|34|22-07-1977|An Act to increase the maximum term of imprisonment which may be imposed on conviction on indictment of an offence under section 19 or 20 of the Northern Ireland (Emergency Provisions) Act 1973 or section 15 of the Northern Ireland (Emergency Provisions) (Amendment) Act 1975.}} |- | {{|Appropriation Act 1977|public|35|29-07-1977|An Act to apply a sum out of the Consolidated Fund to the service of the year ending on 31st March 1978, to appropriate the supplies granted in this Session of Parliament, and to repeal certain Consolidated Fund and Appropriation Acts.}} |- | {{|Finance Act 1977|public|36|29-07-1977|maintained=y|An Act to grant certain duties, to alter other duties, and to amend the law relating to the National Debt and the Public Revenue, and to make further provision in connection with Finance.}} |- | {{|Patents Act 1977|public|37|29-07-1977|maintained=y|An Act to establish a new law of patents applicable to future patents and applications for patents; to amend the law of patents applicable to existing patents and applications for patents; to give effect to certain international conventions on patents; and for connected purposes.}} |- | {{|Administration of Justice Act 1977|public|38|29-07-1977|maintained=y|An Act to make further provision with respect to the administration of justice and matters connected therewith, to alter the method of protecting mortgages of registered land and to amend the law relating to oaths and affirmations and to the interest of a surviving spouse in an intestate's estate.}} |- | {{|Coal Industry Act 1977|public|39|29-07-1977|maintained=y|An Act to increase the limit on the borrowing powers of the National Coal Board, to provide for grants by the Secretary of State to the Board and other persons, to extend the Board's powers and the power to provide pensions and other benefits under the Coal Industry Nationalisation Act 1946.}} |- | {{|Control of Office Development Act 1977|public|40|29-07-1977|An Act to extend the duration of and otherwise amend certain enactments relating to the control of office development in England and Wales.}} |- | {{|Water Charges Equalisation Act 1977|public|41|29-07-1977|maintained=y|An Act to provide for the payment of equalisation levies and payments by and to statutory water undertakers in England and Wales and for purposes connected therewith.}} |- | {{|Rent Act 1977|public|42|29-07-1977|maintained=y|An Act to consolidate the Rent Act 1968, Parts III, IV and VIII of the Housing Finance Act 1972, the Rent Act 1974, sections 7 to 10 of the Housing Rents and Subsidies Act 1975, and certain related enactments, with amendments to give effect to recommendations of the Law Commission.}} |- | {{|Protection from Eviction Act 1977|public|43|29-07-1977|maintained=y|An Act to consolidate section 16 of the Rent Act 1957 and Part III of the Rent Act 1965, and related enactments.}} |- | {{|Post Office Act 1977|public|44|29-07-1977|An Act to increase the maximum number of members of the Post Office.}} |- | {{|Criminal Law Act 1977|public|45|29-07-1977|maintained=y|An Act to amend the law of England and Wales with respect to criminal conspiracy; to make new provision in that law, in place of the provisions of the common law and the Statutes of Forcible Entry, for restricting the use or threat of violence for securing entry into any premises and for penalising unauthorised entry or remaining on premises in certain circumstances; otherwise to amend the criminal law, including the law with respect to the administration of criminal justice; to provide for the alteration of certain pecuniary and other limits; to amend section 9(4) of the Administration of Justice Act 1973, the Legal Aid Act 1974, the Rabies Act 1974 and the Diseases of Animals (Northern Ireland) Order 1975 and the law about juries and coroners' inquests; and for connected purposes.}} |- | {{|Insurance Brokers (Registration) Act 1977|public|46|29-07-1977|maintained=y|An Act to provide for the registration of insurance brokers and for the regulation of their professional standards; and for purposes connected therewith.}} |- | {{|Local Authorities (Restoration of Works Powers) Act 1977|public|47|29-07-1977|maintained=y|An Act to amend provisions of certain orders made by virtue of section 254 of the Local Government Act 1972 so as to restore the powers conferred by those provisions on certain district councils.}} |- | {{|Housing (Homeless Persons) Act 1977|public|48|29-07-1977|maintained=y|An Act to make further provision as to the functions of local authorities with respect to persons who are homeless or threatened with homelessness; to provide for the giving of assistance to voluntary organisations concerned with homelessness by the Secretary of State and local authorities; to repeal section 25 of the National Assistance Act 1948; and for connected purposes.}} |- | {{|National Health Service Act 1977|public|49|29-07-1977|maintained=y|An Act to consolidate certain provisions relating to the health service for England and Wales; and to repeal certain enactments relating to the health service which have ceased to have any effect.}} |- | {{|Unfair Contract Terms Act 1977|public|50|26-10-1977|maintained=y|An Act to impose further limits on the extent to which under the law of England and Wales and Northern Ireland civil liability for breach of contract, or for negligence or other breach of duty, can be avoided by means of contract terms and otherwise, and under the law of Scotland civil liability can be avoided by means of contract terms.}} }}

== Local acts ==
{{legislationuk|act |- | {{|Scottish Transport Group (Castle Bay Pier) Order Confirmation Act 1976|local|38|22-12-1976|An Act to confirm a Provisional Order under the Private Legislation Procedure (Scotland) Act 1936, relating to Scottish Transport Group (Castle Bay Pier).|po1=Scottish Transport Group (Castle Bay Pier) Order 1976|Provisional Order to authorise the Scottish Transport Group to carry out works at their pier at Castle Bay in the Island of Barra within the Western Isles Islands Area to extend the limits of the pier; and for other purposes.}} |- | {{|Anglian Water Authority Act 1977|local|1|17-03-1977|An Act to provide for the development of certain rivers and waterways for recreational purposes; to constitute the Anglian Water Authority as the navigation authority for such rivers and waterways and to provide for the control of such rivers and waterways by the Authority; to provide for the transfer to the Authority of the undertaking of a navigation authority for the river Stour; to empower the Authority to make further discharges of water from the works constructed under the Ely Ouse-Essex Water Act 1968 and for that purpose to carry out works; to confer further powers on the Authority in relation to the performance of their functions; to extend to the area of the Authority certain enactments in force in parts of that area; and for other purposes.}} |- | {{|British Transport Docks Act 1977|local|2|26-05-1977|An Act to extend the time for the compulsory purchase of certain lands; and for other purposes.}} |- | {{|Immediate Transportation (Delivery Warrants) Act 1977|local|3|26-05-1977|An Act to enable Immediate Transportation Company Limited, and its subsidiary companies to issue transferable certificates and warrants for the delivery of goods; and for other purposes.}} |- | {{|Australia and New Zealand Banking Group Act 1977|local|4|16-06-1977|An Act to provide for the incorporation of Australia and New Zealand Banking Group Limited, A.N.Z. Holdings Limited, E.S. & A. Holdings Limited, A.N.Z. Investments Limited and A.N.Z. Nominees Limited in the State of Victoria in the Commonwealth of Australia; for the cesser of application to those companies of provisions of the Companies Acts 1948 to 1976 consequent upon such incorporation; and for other purposes incidental thereto.}} |- | {{|Neath Borough Council Act 1977|local|5|30-06-1977|An Act to make further provision with regard to the markets and undertaking of the Neath Borough Council; and for other purposes.}} |- | {{|Heritable Securities and Mortgage Investment Association, Limited Act 1977|local|6|30-06-1977|An Act to exempt The Heritable Securities and Mortgage Investment Association, Limited from the provisions of the Money-lenders Act 1900, of the Moneylenders Act 1927 and of the Moneylenders Act (Northern Ireland) 1933; and for other purposes.}} |- | {{|Emu Wine Holdings Limited and Subsidiary Companies Act 1977|local|7|30-06-1977|An Act to make provision for the transfer to the State of South Australia in the Commonwealth of Australia of the registered offices of Emu Wine Holdings Limited, The Emu Wine Company Limited, P. J. Howes Limited and Stephen Smith & Company, Limited; for the cesser of application to those companies of provisions of the Companies Acts 1948 to 1976; and for other purposes incidental thereto.}} |- | {{|British Linen Bank Order Confirmation Act 1977|local|8|22-07-1977|An Act to confirm a Provisional Order under the Private Legislation Procedure (Scotland) Act 1936, relating to British Linen Bank.|po1=British Linen Bank Order 1977|Provisional Order to provide for the transfer to The British Linen Bank of the undertaking of Bank of Scotland Finance Company Limited, to make provision for increasing the capital of The British Linen Bank; and for purposes incidental thereto and consequential thereon.}} |- | {{|Fidelity Trust Act 1977|local|9|22-07-1977|An Act to provide for the administration as a charitable trust of the Number 1 Trust held by The Fidelity Trust Limited as trustee; to revise the objects of the trust and provide for the appointment of new trustees; and for other purposes.}} |- | {{|International Planned Parenthood Federation Act 1977|local|10|22-07-1977|An Act to incorporate the International Planned Parenthood Federation; to define the objects and powers of the new incorporated body; and for other purposes.}} |- | {{|London Hydraulic Power Act 1977|local|11|22-07-1977|An Act to confer further powers on the London Hydraulic Power Company; and for other purposes.}} |- | {{|London Transport Act 1977|local|12|22-07-1977|An Act to empower the London Transport Executive to acquire lands; to extend the time for the compulsory purchase of certain lands; to confer further powers on the Executive; and for other purposes.}} |- | {{|Shrewsbury and Atcham Borough Council (Frankwell Footbridge) Act 1977|local|13|22-07-1977|An Act to empower the Shrewsbury and Atcham Borough Council to construct a footbridge over the river Severn; and for other purposes.}} |- | {{|West Midlands County Council Act 1977|local|14|22-07-1977|An Act to enable the West Midlands County Council and the Coventry City Council to make grants towards the cost of insulating dwellings against noise attributable to aircraft using certain aerodromes; to confer further powers upon those councils; and for other purposes.}} |- | {{|City of London (Various Powers) Act 1977|local|15|22-07-1977|An Act to make further provision for the regulation of the exercise of commoners' rights in Epping Forest; the administration of Epping Forest and other open spaces and the provision of facilities for the public therein; finance and administration of the Corporation of London; the exercise of functions of the port health authority of the Port of London; traffic safety at Blackfriars Underpass; and for other purposes.}} |- | {{|British Railways Order Confirmation Act 1977|local|16|29-07-1977|An Act to confirm a Provisional Order under the Private Legislation Procedure (Scotland) Act 1936, relating to British Railways.|po1=British Railways Order 1977|Provisional Order to empower the British Railways Board to construct works and to acquire lands; to confer further powers on the Board; and for other purposes.}} |- | {{|British Railways Act 1977|local|17|29-07-1977|An Act to empower the British Railways Board to construct works and to acquire lands; to extend the time for the compulsory purchase of certain lands; to confer further powers on the Board; and for other purposes.}} |- | {{|Greater London Council (Money) Act 1977|local|18|29-07-1977|An Act to regulate the expenditure on capital account and on lending to other persons by the Greater London Council during the financial period from 1st April 1977 to 30th September 1978; and for other purposes.}} |- | {{|Kensington and Chelsea Corporation Act 1977|local|19|29-07-1977|An Act to make further provision for the local government, health and improvement of the Royal borough of Kensington and Chelsea; and for other purposes.}} |- | {{|North Wales Water Authority Act 1977|local|20|29-07-1977|An Act to confer powers on the North West Water Authority relating to the provision of sludge mains; and for other purposes.}} }}
