= List of acts of the 5th session of the 47th Parliament of the United Kingdom =

This is a list of acts of the 5th session of the 47th Parliament of the United Kingdom, which ran from 1 November 1978 until 7 April 1979.

Acts passed since 1963 are cited by calendar year, as opposed to the convention used for earlier acts of citing the regnal year(s) in which the relevant parliamentary session was held. Each act passed in a respective year is given a chapter number (abbreviated "c."), denoted by Arabic numerals in the case of public general acts, lowercase Roman numerals in the case of local acts, or italicised Arabic numerals in the case of personal acts. These run as separate series.

59 acts of Parliament were passed by the 47th Parliament in its 5th session: 48 public general acts and 11 local acts.

indicates that an act is available to view at legislation.gov.uk, and indicates the location of the original act in the Parliamentary Archives.

== Public general acts ==
{{legislationuk|act |- | {{|Pensioners Payments Act 1978|public|58|23-11-1978|An Act to make provision for lump sum payments to pensioners, and for connected purposes.}} |- | {{|Consolidated Fund (No. 2) Act 1978|public|59|14-12-1978|An Act to apply certain sums out of the Consolidated Fund to the service of the years ending on 31st March 1979 and 1980.}} |- | {{|Price Commission (Amendment) Act 1979|public|1|12-02-1979|An Act to limit the application of section 9 of the Price Commission Act 1977.}} |- | {{|Customs and Excise Management Act 1979|public|2|22-02-1979|maintained=y|An Act to consolidate the enactments relating to the collection and management of the revenues of customs and excise and in some cases to other matters in relation to which the Commissioners of Customs and Excise for the time being perform functions, with amendments to give effect to recommendations of the Law Commission and the Scottish Law Commission.}} |- | {{|Customs and Excise Duties (General Reliefs) Act 1979|public|3|22-02-1979|maintained=y|An Act to consolidate certain enactments relating to reliefs and exemptions from customs and excise duties, section 7 of the Finance Act 1968 and certain other related enactments.}} |- | {{|Alcoholic Liquor Duties Act 1979|public|4|22-02-1979|maintained=y|An Act to consolidate the enactments relating to the excise duties on spirits, beer, wine, made-wine and cider together with certain other enactments relating to excise.}} |- | {{|Hydrocarbon Oil Duties Act 1979|public|5|22-02-1979|maintained=y|An Act to consolidate the enactments relating to the excise duties on hydrocarbon oil, petrol substitutes, power methylated spirits and road fuel gas.}} |- | {{|Matches and Mechanical Lighters Duties Act 1979|public|6|22-02-1979|maintained=y|An Act to consolidate the enactments relating to the excise duties on matches and mechanical lighters.}} |- | {{|Tobacco Products Duty Act 1979|public|7|22-02-1979|maintained=y|An Act to consolidate the enactments relating to the excise duty on tobacco products.}} |- | {{|Excise Duties (Surcharges or Rebates) Act 1979|public|8|22-02-1979|maintained=y|An Act to consolidate the provisions of section 9 of and Schedules 3 and 4 to the Finance Act 1961 with the provisions amending them.}} |- | {{|Films Act 1979|public|9|22-02-1979|maintained=y|An Act to amend section 6 of the Films Act 1960.}} |- | {{|Public Lending Right Act 1979|public|10|22-03-1979|maintained=y|An Act to provide public lending right for authors, and for connected purposes.}} |- | {{|Electricity (Scotland) Act 1979|public|11|22-03-1979|maintained=y|An Act to consolidate certain enactments relating to the North of Scotland Hydro-Electric Board and the South of Scotland Electricity Board and to functions of the Secretary of State in relation to the generation and distribution of electricity in Scotland with amendments to give effect to recommendations of the Scottish Law Commission.}} |- | {{|Wages Councils Act 1979|public|12|22-03-1979|maintained=y|An Act to consolidate the enactments relating to wages councils and statutory joint industrial councils.}} |- | {{|Agricultural Statistics Act 1979|public|13|22-03-1979|maintained=y|An Act to consolidate certain enactments relating to agricultural statistics.}} |- | {{|Capital Gains Tax Act 1979|public|14|22-03-1979|maintained=y|An Act to consolidate Part III of the Finance Act 1965 with related provisions in that Act and subsequent Acts.}} |- | {{|House of Commons (Redistribution of Seats) Act 1979|public|15|22-03-1979|An Act to increase the number of constituencies in Northern Ireland required by rule 1 in Schedule 2 to the House of Commons (Redistribution of Seats) Act 1949.}} |- | {{|Criminal Evidence Act 1979|public|16|22-03-1979|maintained=y|An Act to amend paragraph (f)(iii) of the proviso to section 1 of the Criminal Evidence Act 1898 and corresponding enactments extending to Scotland and Northern Ireland.}} |- | {{|Vaccine Damage Payments Act 1979|public|17|22-03-1979|maintained=y|An Act to provide for payments to be made out of public funds in cases where severe disablement occurs as a result of vaccination against certain diseases or of contact with a person who has been vaccinated against any of those diseases; to make provision in connection with similar payments made before the passing of this Act; and for purposes connected therewith.}} |- | {{|Social Security Act 1979|public|18|22-03-1979|maintained=y|An Act to amend the law relating to social security.}} |- | {{|Administration of Justice (Emergency Provisions) (Scotland) Act 1979|public|19|22-03-1979|An Act to provide for emergency arrangements for the administration of justice in Scotland; to suspend in part the operation of section 17 of the Stamp Act 1891; and for connected purposes.}} |- | {{|Consolidated Fund Act 1979|public|20|22-03-1979|An Act to apply certain sums out of the Consolidated Fund to the service of the years ending on 31st March 1978 and 1979.}} |- | {{|Forestry Act 1979|public|21|29-03-1979|maintained=y|An Act to re-state the power of the Forestry Commissioners to make grants and loans; and to provide for the metrication of enactments relating to forestry and forest lands.}} |- | {{|Confirmation to Small Estates (Scotland) Act 1979|public|22|29-03-1979|maintained=y|An Act to amend the law relating to confirmation to small estates in Scotland; and for connected purposes.}} |- | {{|Public Health Laboratory Service Act 1979|public|23|29-03-1979|maintained=y|An Act to extend the powers conferred by section 5(2)(c) of the National Health Service Act 1977 and to amend certain provisions of that Act relating to the Public Health Laboratory Service Board.}} |- | {{|Appropriation Act 1979|public|24|04-04-1979|An Act to appropriate the supplies granted in this Session of Parliament.}} |- | {{|Finance Act 1979|public|25|04-04-1979|An Act to continue income tax and corporation tax at the existing rates; to increase the main personal reliefs from income tax; to withdraw child tax allowances; and to continue the limit on relief for interest imposed by paragraph 5 of Schedule 1 to the Finance Act 1974.}} |- | {{|Legal Aid Act 1979|public|26|04-04-1979|An Act to amend certain enactments relating to legal aid and legal advice and assistance.}} |- | {{|Kiribati Act 1979|public|27|19-06-1979|maintained=y|An Act to make provision for and in connection with the attainment by the Gilbert Islands of fully responsible status as a Republic within the Commonwealth under the name of Kiribati.}} |- | {{|Carriage by Air and Road Act 1979|public|28|04-04-1979|maintained=y|An Act to enable effect to be given to provisions of certain protocols signed at Montreal on 25th September 1975 which further amend the convention relating to carriage by air known as the Warsaw Convention as amended at The Hague 1955; to modify article 26(2) of the said convention both as in force apart from those protocols and as in force by virtue of them; to provide for the amendment of certain Acts relating to carriage by air or road in consequence of the revision of relevant conventions; and to replace references to gold francs in the Carriage of Goods by Road Act 1965 and the Carriage of Passengers by Road Act 1974 by references to special drawing rights.}} |- | {{|International Monetary Fund Act 1979|public|29|04-04-1979|maintained=y|An Act to consolidate the enactments relating to the International Monetary Fund and to repeal, as obsolete, the European Monetary Agreement Act 1959 and the entries relating to it in Schedule 2 to the National Loans Act 1968.}} |- | {{|Exchange Equalisation Account Act 1979|public|30|04-04-1979|maintained=y|An Act to consolidate the enactments relating to the Exchange Equalisation Account.}} |- | {{|Prosecution of Offences Act 1979|public|31|04-04-1979|An Act to consolidate certain enactments relating to the prosecution of offences in England and Wales and to repeal certain obsolete enactments relating thereto.}} |- | {{|Industry Act 1979|public|32|04-04-1979|maintained=y|An Act to make provision with respect to the limits on sums borrowed by, or paid by Ministers of the Crown to, the National Enterprise Board, the Scottish Development Agency and the Welsh Development Agency and subsidiaries of theirs, on sums paid by the Treasury in pursuance of guarantees of loans to the Board or either of those Agencies and on loans guaranteed by the Board or either of those Agencies or subsidiaries of the Scottish Development Agency.}} |- | {{|Land Registration (Scotland) Act 1979|public|33|04-04-1979|maintained=y|An Act to provide a system of registration of interests in land in Scotland in place of the recording of deeds in the Register of Sasines; and for indemnification in respect of registered interests in land; to simplify certain deeds relating to land and to provide as to the effect of certain other such deeds; to enable tenants-at-will to acquire their landlords' interests in the tenancies; to provide for the fixing of fees payable to the Keeper of the Registers of Scotland; and for connected purposes.}} |- | {{|Credit Unions Act 1979|public|34|04-04-1979|maintained=y|An Act to enable certain societies in Great Britain to be registered under the Industrial and Provident Societies Act 1965 as credit unions; to make further provision with respect to societies so registered; to make provision with respect to the taxation of societies so registered and of Northern Ireland credit unions; to enable reciprocal arrangements to be made in relation to Northern Ireland credit unions; to facilitate the amendment of the Industrial and Provident Societies Act (Northern Ireland) 1969; and for connected purposes.}} |- | {{|Independent Broadcasting Authority Act 1979|public|35|04-04-1979|maintained=y|An Act to confer power on the Independent Broadcasting Authority to equip themselves to transmit a television broadcasting service additional to those of the British Broadcasting Corporation and to that provided by the Authority under the Independent Broadcasting Authority Act 1973.}} |- | {{|Nurses, Midwives and Health Visitors Act 1979|public|36|04-04-1979|maintained=y|An Act to establish a Central Council for Nursing, Midwifery and Health Visiting, and National Boards for the four parts of the United Kingdom; to make new provision with respect to the education, training, regulation and discipline of nurses, midwives and health visitors and the maintenance of a single professional register; to amend an Act relating to the Central Council for Education and Training in Social Work; and for purposes connected with those matters.}} |- | {{|Banking Act 1979|public|37|04-04-1979|maintained=y|An Act to regulate the acceptance of deposits in the course of a business; to confer functions on the Bank of England with respect to the control of institutions carrying on deposit-taking businesses; to give further protection to persons who are depositors with such institutions; to make provision with respect to advertisements inviting the making of deposits; to restrict the use of names and descriptions associated with banks and banking; to prohibit fraudulent inducement to make a deposit; to amend the Consumer Credit Act 1974 and the law with respect to instruments to which section 4 of the Cheques Act 1957 applies; to repeal certain enactments relating to banks and banking; and for purposes connected therewith.}} |- | {{|Estate Agents Act 1979|public|38|04-04-1979|maintained=y|An Act to make provision with respect to the carrying on of and to persons who carry on, certain activities in connection with the disposal and acquisition of interests in land; and for purposes connected therewith.}} |- | {{|Merchant Shipping Act 1979|public|39|04-04-1979|maintained=y|An Act to make amendments of the law relating to pilotage, carriage by sea, liability of shipowners and salvors and pollution from ships and other amendments of the law relating to shipping, pollution and seamen.}} |- | {{|Representation of the People Act 1979|public|40|04-04-1979|An Act to facilitate polling on the same day at a general election and district council elections; and to postpone certain parish or community council elections.}} |- | {{|Pneumoconiosis etc. (Workers' Compensation) Act 1979|public|41|04-04-1979|maintained=y|An Act to make provision for lump sum payments to or in respect of certain persons who are, or were immediately before they died, disabled by pneumoconiosis, byssinosis or diffuse mesothelioma; and for connected purposes.}} |- | {{|Arbitration Act 1979|public|42|04-04-1979|maintained=y|An Act to amend the law relating to arbitrations and for purposes connected therewith.}} |- | {{|Crown Agents Act 1979|public|43|04-04-1979|maintained=y|An Act to reconstitute as a body corporate, and make other provision with respect to, the Crown Agents for Oversea Governments and Administrations, including the establishment of a Board to realise certain of their assets.}} |- | {{|Leasehold Reform Act 1979|public|44|04-04-1979|maintained=y|An Act to provide further protection, for a tenant in possession claiming to acquire the freehold under the Leasehold Reform Act 1967, against artificial inflation of the price he has to pay.}} |- | {{|Weights and Measures Act 1979|public|45|04-04-1979|maintained=y|An Act to make further provision with respect to weights and measures.}} |- | {{|Ancient Monuments and Archaeological Areas Act 1979|public|46|04-04-1979|maintained=y|An Act to consolidate and amend the law relating to ancient monuments; to make provision for the investigation, preservation and recording of matters of archaeological or historical interest and (in connection therewith) for the regulation of operations or activities affecting such matters; to provide for the recovery of grants under section 10 of the Town and Country Planning (Amendment) Act 1972 or under section 4 of the Historic Buildings and Ancient Monuments Act 1953 in certain circumstances; and to provide for grants by the Secretary of State to the Architectural Heritage Fund.}} }}

== Local acts ==
{{legislationuk|act |- | {{|Cunninghame District Council Order Confirmation Act 1978|local|18|14-12-1978|An Act to confirm a Provisional Order under the Private Legislation Procedure (Scotland) Act 1936, relating to Cunninghame District Council.|po1=Cunninghame District Council Order 1978|Provisional Order to confer powers on the Cunninghame District Council with respect to stray dogs; and for other purposes.}} |- | {{|Monklands District Council Order Confirmation Act 1978|local|19|14-12-1978|An Act to confirm a Provisional Order under the Private Legislation Procedure (Scotland) Act 1936, relating to Monklands District Council.|po1=Monklands District Council Order 1978|Provisional Order to confer powers on the Monklands District Council with respect to stray dogs; and for other purposes.}} |- | {{|The District Council of Renfrew Order Confirmation Act 1978|local|20|14-12-1978|An Act to confirm a Provisional Order under the Private Legislation Procedure (Scotland) Act 1936, relating to The District Council of Renfrew.|po1=The District Council of Renfrew Order 1978|Provisional Order to confer powers on The District Council of Renfrew with respect to stray dogs; and for other purposes.}} |- | {{|British Railways Act 1978|local|21|14-12-1978|An Act to empower the British Railways Board to construct works and to acquire lands; to extend the time for the compulsory purchase of certain lands; to confer further powers on the Board; and for other purposes.}} |- | {{|Tyne and Wear Passenger Transport Act 1979|local|1|12-02-1979|An Act to make provision for the regulation and integration of passenger transport services provided by the Tyne and Wear Passenger Transport Executive; the rating of the Tyne and Wear Metropolitan Railway; and for other purposes.}} |- | {{|Inverclyde District Council Order Confirmation Act 1979|local|2|22-02-1979|An Act to confirm a Provisional Order under the Private Legislation Procedure (Scotland) Act 1936, relating to Inverclyde District Council.|po1=Inverclyde District Council Order 1978|po1note1= (Note: Although passed in 1979, the short title specifies the year 1978.)|Provisional Order to confer powers on the Inverclyde District Council with respect to stray dogs; and for other purposes.}} |- | {{|Solicitors in the Supreme Courts of Scotland (Amendment) Order Confirmation Act 1979|local|3|22-02-1979|An Act to confirm a Provisional Order under the Private Legislation Procedure (Scotland) Act 1936, relating to Solicitors in the Supreme Courts of Scotland (Amendment).|po1=Solicitors in the Supreme Courts of Scotland (Amendment) Order 1978|po1note1=|Provisional Order to vary and amend the provisions of the Solicitors in the Supreme Courts of Scotland Act 1871 and for purposes connected therewith.}} |- | {{|Tamar Bridge Act 1979|local|4|22-02-1979|maintained=y|An Act to amend the Tamar Bridge Act 1957, to repeal certain provisions of that Act and of the County of Cornwall Act 1929 and to provide that the other provisions of the Tamar Bridge Act 1957 shall continue to have effect notwithstanding section 262(9) of the Local Government Act 1972; and for other purposes.}} |- | {{|Shetland Islands Council Order Confirmation Act 1979|local|5|04-04-1979|An Act to confirm a Provisional Order under the Private Legislation Procedure (Scotland) Act 1936, relating to Shetland Islands Council.|po1=Shetland Islands Council Order 1979|Provisional Order (as modified) to amend the Zetland County Council Act 1974; and for related purposes.}} |- | {{|Lerwick Harbour Order Confirmation Act 1979|local|6|04-04-1979|An Act to confirm a Provisional Order under the Private Legislation Procedure (Scotland) Act 1936, relating to Lerwick Harbour.|po1=Lerwick Harbour Order 1979|Provisional Order to authorise the Trustees of the port and harbour of Lerwick to construct new works in connection with the improvement of the harbour; and for other purposes.}} |- | {{|Gairloch Piers Order Confirmation Act 1979|local|7|04-04-1979|An Act to confirm a Provisional Order under the Private Legislation Procedure (Scotland) Act 1936, relating to Gairloch Piers.|po1=Gairloch Piers Order 1979|Provisional Order to confer powers on the Highland Regional Council with respect to their piers at Gairloch; and for purposes connected therewith.}} }}
