= List of acts of the 1st session of the 53rd Parliament of the United Kingdom =

This is a list of acts of the 1st session of the 53rd Parliament of the United Kingdom, which ran from 13 June 2001 until 7 November 2002.

Acts passed since 1963 are cited by calendar year, as opposed to the convention used for earlier acts of citing the regnal year(s) in which the relevant parliamentary session was held. Each act passed in a respective year is given a chapter number (abbreviated "c."), denoted by Arabic numerals in the case of public general acts, lowercase Roman numerals in the case of local acts, or italicised Arabic numerals in the case of personal acts. These run as separate series.

54 acts of Parliament were passed by the 53rd Parliament in its 1st session: 47 public general acts and 7 local acts.

indicates that an act is available to view at legislation.gov.uk, and indicates the location of the original act in the Parliamentary Archives.

== Public general acts ==
{{legislationuk|act |- | {{|Appropriation (No. 2) Act 2001|public|21|19-07-2001|maintained=y|repealed=y|An Act to authorise the use of resources and the issue of sums out of the Consolidated Fund for the service of the year ending on 31st March 2002 and to appropriate the supply authorised in this Session of Parliament.}} |- | {{|European Communities (Finance) Act 2001|public|22|04-12-2001|maintained=y|repealed=y|An Act to amend the definition of "the Treaties" and "the Community Treaties" in section 1(2) of the European Communities Act 1972 so as to include the decision of 29th September 2000 of the Council on the Communities' system of own resources.}} |- | {{|Human Reproductive Cloning Act 2001|public|23|04-12-2001|maintained=y|repealed=y|An Act to prohibit the placing in a woman of a human embryo which has been created otherwise than by fertilisation.}} |- | {{|Anti-terrorism, Crime and Security Act 2001|public|24|14-12-2001|maintained=y|An Act to amend the Terrorism Act 2000; to make further provision about terrorism and security; to provide for the freezing of assets; to make provision about immigration and asylum; to amend or extend the criminal law and powers for preventing crime and enforcing that law; to make provision about the control of pathogens and toxins; to provide for the retention of communications data; to provide for implementation of Title VI of the Treaty on European Union; and for connected purposes.}} |- | {{|Consolidated Fund (No. 2) Act 2001|public|25|18-12-2001|maintained=y|repealed=y|An Act to authorise the use of resources for the service of the years ending on 31st March 2002 and 2003 and to apply certain sums out of the Consolidated Fund to the service of the years ending on 31st March 2002 and 2003.}} |- | {{|International Development Act 2002|public|1|26-02-2002|maintained=y|An Act to make provision relating to the provision of assistance for countries outside the United Kingdom; to make provision with respect to certain international financial institutions and the Commonwealth Scholarship Commission; and for connected purposes.}} |- | {{|Sex Discrimination (Election Candidates) Act 2002|public|2|26-02-2002|maintained=y|An Act to exclude from the operation of the Sex Discrimination Act 1975 and the Sex Discrimination (Northern Ireland) Order 1976 certain matters relating to the selection of candidates by political parties.}} |- | {{|European Communities (Amendment) Act 2002|public|3|26-02-2002|maintained=y|An Act to make provision consequential on the Treaty signed at Nice on 26th February 2001 amending the Treaty on European Union, the Treaties establishing the European Communities and certain related Acts.}} |- | {{|Travel Concessions (Eligibility) Act 2002|public|4|26-02-2002|maintained=y|An Act to amend the law relating to the age at which certain persons become eligible to receive travel concessions on journeys on public passenger transport services; and for connected purposes.}} |- | {{|Civil Defence (Grant) Act 2002|public|5|26-02-2002|maintained=y|repealed=y|An Act to replace section 3 of the Civil Defence Act 1948 in so far as it applies to authorities in England or Wales.}} |- | {{|Northern Ireland Arms Decommissioning (Amendment) Act 2002|public|6|26-02-2002|maintained=y|An Act to provide for the extension of the amnesty period fixed by section 2 of the Northern Ireland Arms Decommissioning Act 1997.}} |- | {{|Homelessness Act 2002|public|7|26-02-2002|maintained=y|An Act to make further provision about the functions of local housing authorities relating to homelessness and the allocation of housing accommodation; and for connected purposes.}} |- | {{|British Overseas Territories Act 2002|public|8|26-02-2002|maintained=y|An Act to make provision about the name "British overseas territories" and British citizenship so far as relating to the British overseas territories.}} |- | {{|Land Registration Act 2002|public|9|26-02-2002|maintained=y|An Act to make provision about land registration; and for connected purposes.}} |- | {{|Consolidated Fund Act 2002|public|10|19-03-2002|maintained=y|repealed=y|An Act to authorise the use of resources for the service of the year ending on 31st March 2002 and to apply certain sums out of the Consolidated Fund to the service of the years ending on 31st March 2001 and 2002.}} |- | {{|Office of Communications Act 2002|public|11|19-03-2002|maintained=y|An Act to establish a body corporate to be known as the Office of Communications; and to confer functions in relation to proposals about the regulation of communications on that body, on certain existing regulators and on the Secretary of State.}} |- | {{|Football (Disorder) (Amendment) Act 2002|public|12|01-05-2002|maintained=y|An Act to amend section 5 of the Football (Disorder) Act 2000; and for connected purposes.}} |- | {{|Electoral Fraud (Northern Ireland) Act 2002|public|13|01-05-2002|maintained=y|An Act to provide for the supply to the Chief Electoral Officer for Northern Ireland of the signatures, dates of birth and national insurance numbers of electors and persons seeking registration as electors in Northern Ireland and of information relating to their period of residence in Northern Ireland and addresses in respect of which they are or have applied to be registered; for the use of that information in connection with elections in Northern Ireland; for the issue of electoral identity cards by the Chief Electoral Officer for Northern Ireland; for the modification in relation to voters with disabilities of certain rules about voting procedure in Northern Ireland; and for connected purposes.}} |- | {{|National Heritage Act 2002|note1= (Note: The section of the National Heritage Act 2002 conferring its short title originally stated that the Act was the "National Heritage Act 2001", but this was corrected by a correction slip in January 2003.)|public|14|01-05-2002|maintained=y|An Act to make further provision in relation to the functions of the Historic Buildings and Monuments Commission for England; and for connected purposes.}} |- | {{|Commonhold and Leasehold Reform Act 2002|public|15|01-05-2002|maintained=y|An Act to make provision about commonhold land and to amend the law about leasehold property.}} |- | {{|State Pension Credit Act 2002|public|16|25-06-2002|maintained=y|An Act to make provision for and in connection with a new social security benefit called state pension credit; and to amend section 47(1) of the Pension Schemes Act 1993.}} |- | {{|National Health Service Reform and Health Care Professions Act 2002|public|17|25-06-2002|maintained=y|An Act to amend the law about the national health service; to establish and make provision in connection with a Commission for Patient and Public Involvement in Health; to make provision in relation to arrangements for joint working between NHS bodies and the prison service, and between NHS bodies and local authorities in Wales; to make provision in connection with the regulation of health care professions; and for connected purposes.}} |- | {{|Appropriation Act 2002|public|18|08-07-2002|maintained=y|repealed=y|An Act to authorise the use of resources and the issue of sums out of the Consolidated Fund for the service of the year ending on 31st March 2003; to appropriate the supply authorised in this Session of Parliament; and to repeal certain Consolidated Fund and Appropriation Acts.}} |- | {{|National Insurance Contributions Act 2002|public|19|08-07-2002|maintained=y|An Act to make provision for, and in connection with, increasing national insurance contributions and for applying the increases towards the cost of the national health service.}} |- | {{|Industrial and Provident Societies Act 2002|public|20|08-07-2002|maintained=y|repealed=y|An Act to enable the law relating to societies registered under the Industrial and Provident Societies Act 1965 to be amended so as to bring it into conformity with certain aspects of the law relating to companies; to amend the procedure whereby such a society may convert itself into, or amalgamate with or transfer its engagements to, a company; and for connected purposes.}} |- | {{|Tax Credits Act 2002|public|21|08-07-2002|maintained=y|An Act to make provision for tax credits; to amend the law about child benefit and guardian's allowance; and for connected purposes.}} |- | {{|Employment Act 2002|public|22|08-07-2002|maintained=y|An Act to make provision for statutory rights to paternity and adoption leave and pay; to amend the law relating to statutory maternity leave and pay; to amend the Employment Tribunals Act 1996; to make provision for the use of statutory procedures in relation to employment disputes; to amend the law relating to particulars of employment; to make provision about compromise agreements; to make provision for questionnaires in relation to equal pay; to make provision in connection with trade union learning representatives; to amend section 110 of the Employment Rights Act 1996; to make provision about fixed-term work; to make provision about flexible working; to amend the law relating to maternity allowance; to make provision for work-focused interviews for partners of benefit claimants; to make provision about the use of information for, or relating to, employment and training; and for connected purposes.}} |- | {{|Finance Act 2002|public|23|24-07-2002|maintained=y|An Act to grant certain duties, to alter other duties, and to amend the law relating to the National Debt and the Public Revenue, and to make further provision in connection with finance.}} |- | {{|European Parliamentary Elections Act 2002|public|24|24-07-2002|maintained=y|An Act to consolidate the European Parliamentary Elections Acts 1978, 1993 and 1999.}} |- | {{|Copyright, etc. and Trade Marks (Offences and Enforcement) Act 2002|public|25|24-07-2002|maintained=y|An Act to amend the Copyright, Designs and Patents Act 1988 in respect of criminal offences, search warrants, powers of seizure and orders for forfeiture; to amend the Trade Marks Act 1994 in respect of search warrants and powers of seizure; and for connected purposes.}} |- | {{|Justice (Northern Ireland) Act 2002|public|26|24-07-2002|maintained=y|An Act to make provision about the judiciary in Northern Ireland and to amend section 6 of the Appellate Jurisdiction Act 1876; to make provision about the law officers and other legal officers and the courts in Northern Ireland; to establish a Public Prosecution Service for Northern Ireland, a Chief Inspector of Criminal Justice in Northern Ireland and a Northern Ireland Law Commission; to amend the law of youth justice in Northern Ireland; to make provision for making available to victims of crime information about the release of offenders in Northern Ireland; to make provision about community safety in Northern Ireland; to amend the law of legal aid in Northern Ireland; and for connected purposes.}} |- | {{|Divorce (Religious Marriages) Act 2002|public|27|24-07-2002|maintained=y|An Act to make provision enabling a court to require the dissolution of a religious marriage before granting a civil divorce.}} |- | {{|Export Control Act 2002|public|28|24-07-2002|maintained=y|An Act to make provision enabling controls to be imposed on the exportation of goods, the transfer of technology, the provision of technical assistance overseas and activities connected with trade in controlled goods; and for connected purposes.}} |- | {{|Proceeds of Crime Act 2002|public|29|24-07-2002|maintained=y|An Act to establish the Assets Recovery Agency and make provision about the appointment of its Director and his functions (including Revenue functions), to provide for confiscation orders in relation to persons who benefit from criminal conduct and for restraint orders to prohibit dealing with property, to allow the recovery of property which is or represents property obtained through unlawful conduct or which is intended to be used in unlawful conduct, to make provision about money laundering, to make provision about investigations relating to benefit from criminal conduct or to property which is or represents property obtained through unlawful conduct or to money laundering, to make provision to give effect to overseas requests and orders made where property is found or believed to be obtained through criminal conduct, and for connected purposes.}} |- | {{|Police Reform Act 2002|public|30|24-07-2002|maintained=y|An Act to make new provision about the supervision, administration, functions and conduct of police forces, police officers and other persons serving with, or carrying out functions in relation to, the police; to amend police powers and to provide for the exercise of police powers by persons who are not police officers; to amend the law relating to anti-social behaviour orders; to amend the law relating to sex offender orders; and for connected purposes.}} |- | {{|Mobile Telephones (Re-programming) Act 2002|public|31|24-07-2002|maintained=y|An Act to create offences in respect of unique electronic equipment identifiers of mobile wireless communications devices.}} |- | {{|Education Act 2002|public|32|24-07-2002|maintained=y|An Act to make provision about education, training and childcare.}} |- | {{|Copyright (Visually Impaired Persons) Act 2002|public|33|07-11-2002|maintained=y|repealed=y|An Act to permit, without infringement of copyright, the transfer of copyright works to formats accessible to visually impaired persons.}} |- | {{|Employee Share Schemes Act 2002|public|34|07-11-2002|maintained=y|repealed=y|An Act to make provision relating to employee share schemes; and for connected purposes.}} |- | {{|Public Trustee (Liability and Fees) Act 2002|public|35|07-11-2002|maintained=y|An Act to amend the Public Trustee Act 1906 in respect of the liability and fees of the Public Trustee; and for connected purposes.}} |- | {{|Tobacco Advertising and Promotion Act 2002|public|36|07-11-2002|maintained=y|An Act to control the advertising and promotion of tobacco products; and for connected purposes.}} |- | {{|Private Hire Vehicles (Carriage of Guide Dogs etc.) Act 2002|public|37|07-11-2002|maintained=y|An Act to make provision for the carriage of disabled persons accompanied by guide dogs, hearing dogs or other assistance dogs by drivers and operators of private hire vehicles; and for connected purposes.}} |- | {{|Adoption and Children Act 2002|public|38|07-11-2002|maintained=y|An Act to restate and amend the law relating to adoption; to make further amendments of the law relating to children; to amend section 93 of the Local Government Act 2000; and for connected purposes.}} |- | {{|Commonwealth Act 2002|public|39|07-11-2002|maintained=y|An Act to amend the law with respect to the Commonwealth Institute; to make provision in connection with the admission of Cameroon and Mozambique to the Commonwealth; and for connected purposes.}} |- | {{|Enterprise Act 2002|public|40|07-11-2002|maintained=y|An Act to establish and provide for the functions of the Office of Fair Trading, the Competition Appeal Tribunal and the Competition Service; to make provision about mergers and market structures and conduct; to amend the constitution and functions of the Competition Commission; to create an offence for those entering into certain anti-competitive agreements; to provide for the disqualification of directors of companies engaging in certain anti-competitive practices; to make other provision about competition law; to amend the law relating to the protection of the collective interests of consumers; to make further provision about the disclosure of information obtained under competition and consumer legislation; to amend the Insolvency Act 1986 and make other provision about insolvency; and for connected purposes.}} |- | {{|Nationality, Immigration and Asylum Act 2002|public|41|07-11-2002|maintained=y|An Act to make provision about nationality, immigration and asylum; to create offences in connection with international traffic in prostitution; to make provision about international projects connected with migration; and for connected purposes.}} |- | {{|Animal Health Act 2002|public|42|07-11-2002|maintained=y|An Act to amend the Animal Health Act 1981.}} }}

== Local acts ==
{{legislationuk|act |- | {{|National Australia Group Europe Act 2001|local|5|04-12-2001|maintained=y|An Act to provide for the fusion of the undertakings of Clydesdale Bank PLC and Yorkshire Bank PLC by the transfer to Clydesdale Bank PLC of the undertaking of Yorkshire Bank PLC; and for connected purposes.}} |- | {{|Greenham and Crookham Commons Act 2002|local|1|01-05-2002|maintained=y|An Act to restore land at and in the vicinity of the Greenham and Crookham Commons as common land open to the public; to make provision for the conservation of the natural beauty of that land; to grant public access over that land in perpetuity and to make provision with respect to that public access; to restore and extend commoners' rights over that land; to constitute the Greenham and Crookham Common Commission for the management of that land; to confer powers on the West Berkshire District Council and on that Commission with respect to that land; and for connected and other purposes.}} |- | {{|Land at Palace Avenue, Kensington (Acquisition of Freehold) Act 2002|local|2|25-06-2002|maintained=y|An Act to authorise the trustees of the Imperial Tobacco Pension Fund to acquire the freehold of land forming part of the Royal Garden Hotel, Kensington; and for connected purposes.}} |- | {{|HSBC Investment Banking Act 2002|local|3|07-11-2002|maintained=y|An Act to provide for the transfer of the investment banking business of HSBC Investment Bank plc to HSBC Bank plc and the transfer of the private banking business of HSBC Investment Bank plc to HSBC Republic Bank (UK) Limited; and for connected purposes.}} |- | {{|Barclays Group Reorganisation Act 2002|local|4|07-11-2002|maintained=y|An Act to provide for the reorganisation of the undertakings of Barclays Bank PLC and certain of its subsidiaries; and for related purposes.}} |- | {{|Milford Haven Port Authority Act 2002|local|5|07-11-2002|maintained=y|An Act to alter the constitution of and confer further powers upon the Milford Haven Port Authority.}} |- | {{|City of London (Ward Elections) Act 2002|local|6|07-11-2002|maintained=y|An Act to make further provision with respect to the qualification of voters at ward elections in the city of London; and for connected purposes.}} }}
