= List of acts of the 3rd session of the 52nd Parliament of the United Kingdom =

This is a list of acts of the 3rd session of the 52nd Parliament of the United Kingdom, which ran from 17 November 1999 until 30 November 2000.

Acts passed since 1963 are cited by calendar year, as opposed to the convention used for earlier acts of citing the regnal year(s) in which the relevant parliamentary session was held. Each act passed in a respective year is given a chapter number (abbreviated "c."), denoted by Arabic numerals in the case of public general acts, lowercase Roman numerals in the case of local acts, or italicised Arabic numerals in the case of personal acts. These run as separate series.

52 acts of Parliament were passed by the 52nd Parliament in its 3rd session: 45 public general acts and 7 local acts.

indicates that an act is available to view at legislation.gov.uk, and indicates the location of the original act in the Parliamentary Archives.

== Public general acts ==
{{legislationuk|act |- | {{|Consolidated Fund (No. 2) Act 1999|public|35|16-12-1999|maintained=y|An Act to apply certain sums out of the Consolidated Fund to the service of the years ending on 31st March 2000 and 2001.}} |- | {{|Northern Ireland Act 2000|public|1|10-02-2000|maintained=y|repealed=y|An Act to make provision for the suspension of devolved government in Northern Ireland and the exercise of certain functions conferred by or under Part V of the Northern Ireland Act 1998; and for connected purposes.}} |- | {{|Representation of the People Act 2000|public|2|09-03-2000|maintained=y|An Act to make new provision with respect to the registration of voters for the purposes of parliamentary and local government elections; to make other provision in relation to voting at such elections; and for connected purposes.}} |- | {{|Consolidated Fund Act 2000|public|3|21-03-2000|maintained=y|repealed=y|An Act to apply certain sums out of the Consolidated Fund to the service of the years ending on 31st March 1999, 2000 and 2001.}} |- | {{|Armed Forces Discipline Act 2000|public|4|25-05-2000|maintained=y|repealed=y|An Act to amend the Army Act 1955, the Air Force Act 1955 and the Naval Discipline Act 1957 in relation to custody, the right to elect court-martial trial and appeals against findings made or punishments awarded on summary dealing or summary trial; and for connected purposes.}} |- | {{|Nuclear Safeguards Act 2000|public|5|25-05-2000|maintained=y|An Act to enable effect to be given to the protocol signed at Vienna on 22nd September 1998 additional to the agreement for the application of safeguards in the United Kingdom in connection with the Treaty on the Non-Proliferation of Nuclear Weapons; to allow effect to be given to that agreement in certain territories outside the United Kingdom; and for connected purposes.}} |- | {{|Powers of Criminal Courts (Sentencing) Act 2000|public|6|25-05-2000|maintained=y|An Act to consolidate certain enactments relating to the powers of courts to deal with offenders and defaulters and to the treatment of such persons, with amendments to give effect to recommendations of the Law Commission and the Scottish Law Commission.}} |- | {{|Electronic Communications Act 2000|public|7|25-05-2000|maintained=y|An Act to make provision to facilitate the use of electronic communications and electronic data storage; to make provision about the modification of licences granted under section 7 of the Telecommunications Act 1984; and for connected purposes.}} |- | {{|Financial Services and Markets Act 2000|public|8|14-06-2000|maintained=y|An Act to make provision about the regulation of financial services and markets; to provide for the transfer of certain statutory functions relating to building societies, friendly societies, industrial and provident societies and certain other mutual societies; and for connected purposes.}} |- | {{|Consolidated Fund (Appropriation) Act 2000|public|9|20-07-2000|maintained=y|repealed=y|An Act to apply a sum out of the Consolidated Fund to the service of the year ending on 31st March 2001; to appropriate the supplies granted in this Session of Parliament; and to repeal certain Consolidated Fund and Appropriation Acts.}} |- | {{|Crown Prosecution Service Inspectorate Act 2000|public|10|20-07-2000|maintained=y|An Act to make provision for inspection of the Crown Prosecution Service.}} |- | {{|Terrorism Act 2000|public|11|20-07-2000|maintained=y|An Act to make provision about terrorism; and to make temporary provision for Northern Ireland about the prosecution and punishment of certain offences, the preservation of peace and the maintenance of order.}} |- | {{|Limited Liability Partnerships Act 2000|public|12|20-07-2000|maintained=y|An Act to make provision for limited liability partnerships.}} |- | {{|Royal Parks (Trading) Act 2000|public|13|20-07-2000|maintained=y|An Act to make provision about certain offences under section 2 of the Parks Regulation (Amendment) Act 1926.}} |- | {{|Care Standards Act 2000|public|14|20-07-2000|maintained=y|An Act to establish a National Care Standards Commission; to make provision for the registration and regulation of children's homes, independent hospitals, independent clinics, care homes, residential family centres, independent medical agencies, domiciliary care agencies, fostering agencies, nurses agencies and voluntary adoption agencies; to make provision for the regulation and inspection of local authority fostering and adoption services; to establish a General Social Care Council and a Care Council for Wales and make provision for the registration, regulation and training of social care workers; to establish a Children's Commissioner for Wales; to make provision for the registration, regulation and training of those providing child minding or day care; to make provision for the protection of children and vulnerable adults; to amend the law about children looked after in schools and colleges; to repeal the Nurses Agencies Act 1957; to amend Schedule 1 to the Local Authority Social Services Act 1970; and for connected purposes.}} |- | {{|Television Licences (Disclosure of Information) Act 2000|public|15|20-07-2000|maintained=y|An Act to make provision about the disclosure of certain information for purposes connected with television licences.}} |- | {{|Carers and Disabled Children Act 2000|public|16|20-07-2000|maintained=y|repealed=y|An Act to make provision about the assessment of carers' needs; to provide for services to help carers; to provide for the making of payments to carers and disabled children aged 16 or 17 in lieu of the provision of services to them; and for connected purposes.}} |- | {{|Finance Act 2000|public|17|28-07-2000|maintained=y|An Act to grant certain duties, to alter other duties, and to amend the law relating to the National Debt and the Public Revenue, and to make further provision in connection with Finance.}} |- | {{|Sea Fishing Grants (Charges) Act 2000|public|18|28-07-2000|maintained=y|An Act to ensure the validity of charges made in the administration of certain grant schemes relating to sea fishing.}} |- | {{|Child Support, Pensions and Social Security Act 2000|public|19|28-07-2000|maintained=y|An Act to amend the law relating to child support; to amend the law relating to occupational and personal pensions and war pensions; to amend the law relating to social security benefits and social security administration; to amend the law relating to national insurance contributions; to amend Part III of the Family Law Reform Act 1969 and Part III of the Family Law Act 1986; and for connected purposes.}} |- | {{|Government Resources and Accounts Act 2000|public|20|28-07-2000|maintained=y|An Act to make provision about government resources and accounts; to provide for financial assistance for a body established to participate in public-private partnerships; and for connected purposes.}} |- | {{|Learning and Skills Act 2000|public|21|28-07-2000|maintained=y|An Act to establish the Learning and Skills Council for England and the National Council for Education and Training for Wales, to make other provision about education and training, and for connected purposes.}} |- | {{|Local Government Act 2000|public|22|28-07-2000|maintained=y|An Act to make provision with respect to the functions and procedures of local authorities and provision with respect to local authority elections; to make provision with respect to grants and housing benefit in respect of certain welfare services; to amend section 29 of the Children Act 1989; and for connected purposes.}} |- | {{|Regulation of Investigatory Powers Act 2000|public|23|28-07-2000|maintained=y|An Act to make provision for and about the interception of communications, the acquisition and disclosure of data relating to communications, the carrying out of surveillance, the use of covert human intelligence sources and the acquisition of the means by which electronic data protected by encryption or passwords may be decrypted or accessed; to provide for Commissioners and a tribunal with functions and jurisdiction in relation to those matters, to entries on and interferences with property or with wireless telegraphy and to the carrying out of their functions by the Security Service, the Secret Intelligence Service and the Government Communications Headquarters; and for connected purposes.}} |- | {{|Census (Amendment) Act 2000|public|24|28-07-2000|maintained=y|An Act to amend the Census Act 1920 to enable particulars to be required in respect of religion.}} |- | {{|Football (Disorder) Act 2000|public|25|28-07-2000|maintained=y|An Act to make further provision for the purpose of preventing violence or disorder at or in connection with association football matches; and for connected purposes.}} |- | {{|Postal Services Act 2000|public|26|28-07-2000|maintained=y|An Act to establish the Postal Services Commission and the Consumer Council for Postal Services; to provide for the licensing of certain postal services and for a universal postal service; to provide for the vesting of the property, rights and liabilities of the Post Office in a company nominated by the Secretary of State and for the subsequent dissolution of the Post Office; to make further provision in relation to postal services; and for connected purposes.}} |- | {{|Utilities Act 2000|public|27|28-07-2000|maintained=y|An Act to provide for the establishment and functions of the Gas and Electricity Markets Authority and the Gas and Electricity Consumer Council; to amend the legislation regulating the gas and electricity industries; and for connected purposes.}} |- | {{|Health Service Commissioners (Amendment) Act 2000|public|28|23-11-2000|maintained=y|An Act to amend the Health Service Commissioners Act 1993.}} |- | {{|Trustee Act 2000|public|29|23-11-2000|maintained=y|An Act to amend the law relating to trustees and persons having the investment powers of trustees; and for connected purposes.}} |- | {{|Licensing (Young Persons) Act 2000|public|30|23-11-2000|maintained=y|repealed=y|An Act to make provision in connection with the sale and consumption of intoxicating liquor in cases involving persons under eighteen; and for connected purposes.}} |- | {{|Warm Homes and Energy Conservation Act 2000|public|31|23-11-2000|maintained=y|An Act to require the Secretary of State to publish and implement a strategy for reducing fuel poverty; to require the setting of targets for the implementation of that strategy; and for connected purposes.}} |- | {{|Police (Northern Ireland) Act 2000|public|32|23-11-2000|maintained=y|An Act to make provision about policing in Northern Ireland; and for connected purposes.}} |- | {{|Fur Farming (Prohibition) Act 2000|public|33|23-11-2000|maintained=y|An Act to prohibit the keeping of animals solely or primarily for slaughter for the value of their fur; to provide for the making of payments in respect of the related closure of certain businesses; and for connected purposes.}} |- | {{|Race Relations (Amendment) Act 2000|public|34|30-11-2000|maintained=y|An Act to extend further the application of the Race Relations Act 1976 to the police and other public authorities; to amend the exemption under that Act for acts done for the purpose of safeguarding national security; and for connected purposes.}} |- | {{|Children (Leaving Care) Act 2000|public|35|30-11-2000|maintained=y|An Act to make provision about children and young persons who are being, or have been, looked after by a local authority; to replace section 24 of the Children Act 1989; and for connected purposes.}} |- | {{|Freedom of Information Act 2000|public|36|30-11-2000|maintained=y|An Act to make provision for the disclosure of information held by public authorities or by persons providing services for them and to amend the Data Protection Act 1998 and the Public Records Act 1958; and for connected purposes.}} |- | {{|Countryside and Rights of Way Act 2000|public|37|30-11-2000|maintained=y|An Act to make new provision for public access to the countryside; to amend the law relating to public rights of way; to enable traffic regulation orders to be made for the purpose of conserving an area's natural beauty; to make provision with respect to the driving of mechanically propelled vehicles elsewhere than on roads; to amend the law relating to nature conservation and the protection of wildlife; to make further provision with respect to areas of outstanding natural beauty; and for connected purposes.}} |- | {{|Transport Act 2000|public|38|30-11-2000|maintained=y|An Act to make provision about transport.}} |- | {{|Insolvency Act 2000|public|39|30-11-2000|maintained=y|An Act to amend the law about insolvency; to amend the Company Directors Disqualification Act 1986; and for connected purposes.}} |- | {{|Protection of Animals (Amendment) Act 2000|public|40|30-11-2000|maintained=y|repealed=y|An Act to enable provision to be made for the care, disposal or slaughter of animals to which proceedings under section 1 of the Protection of Animals Act 1911 relate; and for connected purposes.}} |- | {{|Political Parties, Elections and Referendums Act 2000|public|41|30-11-2000|maintained=y|An Act to establish an Electoral Commission; to make provision about the registration and finances of political parties; to make provision about donations and expenditure for political purposes; to make provision about election and referendum campaigns and the conduct of referendums; to make provision about election petitions and other legal proceedings in connection with elections; to reduce the qualifying periods set out in sections 1 and 3 of the Representation of the People Act 1985; to make pre-consolidation amendments relating to European Parliamentary Elections; and for connected purposes.}} |- | {{|Disqualifications Act 2000|public|42|30-11-2000|maintained=y|An Act to remove the disqualification for membership of the House of Commons and the Northern Ireland Assembly of persons who are members of the legislature of Ireland (the Oireachtas); to disqualify for certain offices which may be held by members of the Northern Ireland Assembly persons who are or become Ministers of the Government of Ireland or chairmen or deputy chairmen of committees of the Dáil Éireann or the Seanad Éireann or of joint committees of the Oireachtas; and to make provision with respect to who may be chairman or deputy chairman of a statutory committee of the Assembly or a member of the Northern Ireland Assembly Commission.}} |- | {{|Criminal Justice and Courts Services Act 2000|public|43|30-11-2000|maintained=y|An Act to establish a National Probation Service for England and Wales and a Children and Family Court Advisory and Support Service; to make further provision for the protection of children; to make further provision about dealing with persons suspected of, charged with or convicted of offences; to amend the law relating to access to information held under Part III of the Road Traffic Act 1988; and for connected purposes.}} |- | {{|Sexual Offences (Amendment) Act 2000|public|44|30-11-2000|maintained=y|An Act to reduce the age at which, and to make provision with respect to the circumstances in which, certain sexual acts are lawful; to make it an offence for a person aged 18 or over to engage in sexual activity with or directed towards a person under that age if he is in a position of trust in relation to that person; and for connected purposes.}} }}

== Local acts ==
{{legislationuk|act |- | {{|Comhairle Nan Eilean Siar (Eriskay Causeway) Order Confirmation Act 2000|local|1|10-02-2000|maintained=y|An Act to confirm a Provisional Order under the Private Legislation Procedure (Scotland) Act 1936, relating to Comhairle Nan Eilean Siar (Eriskay Causeway).|po1=Comhairle Nan Eilean Siar (Eriskay Causeway) Order 2000|Provisional Order to authorise Comhairle Nan Eilean Siar to construct a causeway for pedestrian and vehicular traffic between the islands of South Uist and Eriskay in na h'Eileanan an Iar; to acquire lands; and for connected purposes.}} |- | {{|United Reformed Church Act 2000|local|2|10-02-2000|maintained=y|An Act to make provision as to property held on behalf of the Congregational Union of Scotland, its member churches and the Scottish Congregational College, and for other purposes incidental to or consequential upon the unification of the Congregational Union of Scotland with the United Reformed Church in the United Kingdom; to amend the United Reformed Church Act 1972 and the United Reformed Church Act 1981; and for connected purposes.}} |- | {{|Alliance & Leicester plc (Group Reorganisation) Act 2000|local|3|10-02-2000|maintained=y|An Act to provide for the transfer to Alliance & Leicester plc of the undertakings of Girobank plc and Alliance & Leicester Personal Finance Limited; and for related purposes.}} |- | {{|Baxi Partnership Limited Trusts Act 2000|local|4|10-02-2000|maintained=y|An Act to confirm the validity of and vary the trusts of a settlement created by Baxi Partnership Limited for the benefit of employees of Baxi Partnership Limited; to modify certain provisions of the settlement; to confer powers on the trustees of that settlement; and for other purposes.}} |- | {{|Transport Salaried Staffs' Association (Amendment of Rules) Act 2000|local|5|09-03-2000|maintained=y|An Act to enact provisions relating to the amendment of the rules of the Transport Salaried Staffs' Association, and for other purposes.}} |- | {{|Railtrack (Waverley Station) Order Confirmation Act 2000|local|6|14-06-2000|maintained=y|An Act to confirm a Provisional Order under the Private Legislation Procedure (Scotland) Act 1936, relating to Railtrack (Waverley Station).|po1=Railtrack (Waverley Station) Order 2000|Provisional Order to limit the operation of restrictions which may affect Waverley Station in the city of Edinburgh or the land on which it is situated; to repeal certain local statutory provisions relating to Waverley Station; to make good the feudal title to some of the land within Waverley Station; and for connected purposes.}} |- | {{|London Local Authorities Act 2000|local|7|20-07-2000|maintained=y|An Act to confer further powers upon local authorities in London; and for related purposes.}} }}
