= List of public art in Westminster =

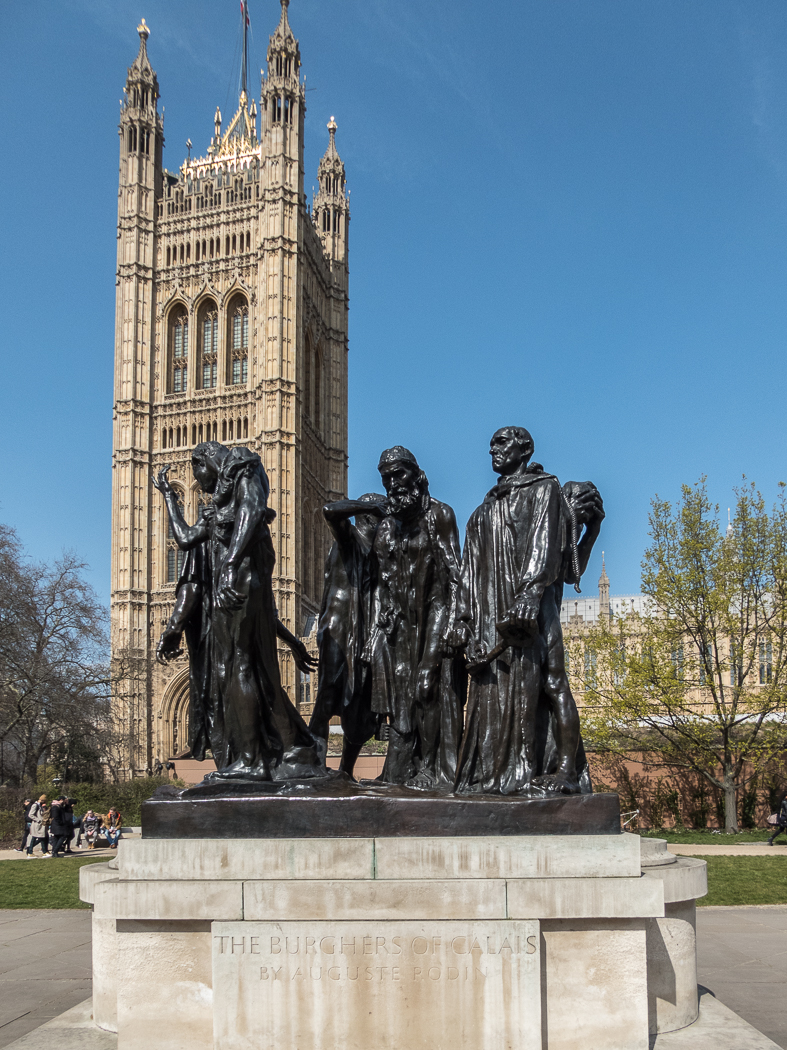
Rodin's Burghers of Calais, with the Victoria Tower in the background.

This is a list of public art in Westminster, a district in the City of Westminster, London.

The area's main sculptural showcase is Parliament Square, conceived in the 1860s to improve the setting of the rebuilt Palace of Westminster, to ease traffic flow and as a site for commemorating politicians of note. Statues of the engineers Robert Stephenson and Isambard Kingdom Brunel by Carlo Marochetti were initially considered for the square, but were rejected as not fitting in with the political theme. (They were ultimately erected outside Euston station and on the Victoria Embankment.) The square took on its present configuration in a refurbishment of 1949–1950 by the architect George Grey Wornum, though four statues of twentieth-century figures have since been added.

Another two political memorials (one of which, the Buxton Memorial Fountain, was moved by Wornum from Parliament Square) and The Burghers of Calais, a work on a historical theme by Auguste Rodin, are to be found in Victoria Tower Gardens. As the memorials therein all touch on the theme of opposition to injustice, the gardens have been described by David Adjaye, the designer of a projected national Holocaust memorial for that location, as a "park of Britain's conscience".

Image	Title / subject	Location and coordinates	Date	Artist / designer	Architect / other	Type	Designation	Notes
	Bust of Emery Hill	United Westminster Almshouses, Rochester Row	c. 1675	Anon.	R. R. Arntz (rebuilding)	Bust	Grade II	
More images	Statue of Queen Anne	Outside 13 Queen Anne's Gate	1708 at latest	Francis Bird		Statue	Grade I	
More images	Statue of George Canning	Parliament Square 51.5010°N 0.1277°W	1832	Richard Westmacott	—N/a	Statue	Grade II	Erected 2 May 1832 in New Palace Yard; in its current location since 1949. The features are based on the portrait bust of Canning by Francis Leggatt Chantrey, who was "not at all pleased with the preference shewn to Mr. Westmacott".
More images	Richard Coeur de Lion Richard I	Old Palace Yard 51.4991°N 0.1256°W	1856	Carlo Marochetti	—N/a	Equestrian statue	Grade II	Unveiled 26 October 1860. Casting of a clay model exhibited at the 1851 Great Exhibition to much acclaim; John Ruskin considered it to be "the only really interesting piece of historical sculpture we have".
More images	Westminster Scholars War Memorial	Broad Sanctuary 51.4995°N 0.1292°W	1861	John Richard Clayton and John Birnie Philip	George Gilbert Scott	Column with sculpture	Grade II	Commemorates Lord Raglan and other ex-pupils of Westminster School who died in the Crimean War and the Indian Mutiny. Sculptures represent Saint George and the Dragon, Edward the Confessor and Henry III (builders of Westminster Abbey), Elizabeth I (second founder of the school) and Queen Victoria.
More images	Buxton Memorial Fountain Inscribed to Buxton, Wilberforce, Clarkson, Macaulay, Brougham, Lushington, et al.	Victoria Tower Gardens 51.4961°N 0.1248°W	1865–1866	Thomas Earp (figures now lost)	Samuel Sanders Teulon with Charles Buxton	Drinking fountain	Grade II*	Erected in Parliament Square in 1865–1866. Commissioned by Charles Buxton as a memorial to his father Sir Thomas Buxton and his colleagues in the Abolitionist movement, particularly those associated with the Slavery Abolition Act 1833. Removed in 1949 and re-erected on this site in 1957.
More images	Statue of Edward Smith-Stanley, 14th Earl of Derby	Parliament Square 51.5008°N 0.1273°W	1874	Matthew Noble	—N/a	Statue	Grade II	Unveiled 11 July 1874. Derby is represented wearing his robes as Chancellor of Oxford University. The bronze reliefs around the pedestal depicting scenes from his life were executed by Noble's assistant, Horace Montford.
More images	Statue of Henry John Temple, 3rd Viscount Palmerston	Parliament Square 51.5009°N 0.1271°W	1876	Thomas Woolner	—N/a	Statue	Grade II	Unveiled 2 February 1876. Palmerston is portrayed in middle age, before he became Prime Minister. The pedestal departs from the "Gothic" model of the nearby statues of Derby and Peel.
More images	Statue of Sir Robert Peel, 2nd Baronet	Parliament Square 51.5005°N 0.1273°W	1877 (unveiled)	Matthew Noble	—N/a	Statue	Grade II	Initially a statue of Peel was commissioned from Carlo Marochetti. This was ready by 1853 but was considered to be far too large. Marochetti produced a smaller work which was placed at the entrance to New Palace Yard; this was removed in 1868 and melted down in 1874.
	Bust of the Rev. James Palmer	United Westminster Almshouses, Rochester Row	c. 1882	Anon.	R. R. Arntz	Bust	Grade II	
More images	Statue of Benjamin Disraeli, 1st Earl of Beaconsfield	Parliament Square 51.5006°N 0.1273°W	1883	Mario Raggi	—N/a	Statue	Grade II	Unveiled 19 April 1883. The statue was the "shrine" of the Primrose League, a Conservative association established in Disraeli's memory. This group had an annual tradition of leaving wreaths in front of the statue on "Primrose Day", the anniversary of the prime minister's death.
More images	The Burghers of Calais	Victoria Tower Gardens 51.4975°N 0.1249°W	1884–1889	Auguste Rodin	Eric Gill (lettering)	Sculptural group	Grade I	Unveiled 19 July 1915. The National Art Collections Fund bought the cast in 1910. Rodin wanted the group situated "near the statue of William the Conqueror" (sic) but eventually agreed on a site in Victoria Tower Gardens. The work was relocated and given its current pedestal in 2004.
More images	Statue of Oliver Cromwell	New Palace Yard 51.4999°N 0.1259°W	1899	William Hamo Thornycroft	—N/a	Statue	Grade II	Unveiled 18 November 1899. The decision to erect a statue to Cromwell was controversial; the Irish Nationalist Party forced the withdrawal of public funds to pay for the statue. Instead an anonymous donor, rumoured to be Lord Rosebery, paid for the work.
	Bust of Charles I	St Margaret's Church	20th century?	Anon. (after Anthony van Dyck)	W. A. Forsyth (niche)	Bust	Grade I	
	Swaddled Babies	Former Westminster Children's Hospital, Udall Street	1906–1907 and 1913	After Andrea della Robbia	Read & Macdonald	Majolica roundels	—N/a	Based on the roundels at the Ospedale degli Innocenti, Florence.
	Saint Peter	Former Society for the Propagation of the Gospel building, Great Peter Street	c. 1907–1908	?	William Emerson	Statue in niche	—N/a	
	Ship Off an Unevangelised Shore	Former Society for the Propagation of the Gospel building, Tufton Street	c. 1907–1908	?	William Emerson	Relief	—N/a	
	War memorial	Churchyard of St John's, Smith Square, facing Dean Stanley Street 51.4960°N 0.1268°W	after 1918	?	—N/a	Cross	—N/a	Commemorates the 120 parishioners of the church who died in World War I.
More images	Statue of Abraham Lincoln	Parliament Square 51.5006°N 0.1278°W	1920 (unveiled)	Augustus Saint-Gaudens	McKim, Mead & White	Statue	Grade II	Unveiled July 1920. A replica of the statue of Lincoln in Lincoln Park, Chicago. Initially the statue was to be erected in 1914, but this was postponed until 1917. By that time some favoured an alternative statue by George Grey Barnard; this was eventually erected in Manchester.
	Drinking fountain with two groups of a nanny goat and kid	Victoria Tower Gardens 51.4951°N 0.1248°W	1923	Miss Harris assisted by Charles Sargeant Jagger	—N/a	Drinking fountain with sculptural groups	—N/a	Given by Henry Gage Spicer, the director of a paper firm, for the poor children of the area who used the Gardens as a playground. The extent of "Miss Harris's" involvement in the art deco sculptures is questionable.
More images	Memorial to Emmeline and Christabel Pankhurst	Victoria Tower Gardens 51.4979°N 0.1253°W	1930	Arthur George Walker	Herbert Baker (1930); Peter Hills (1959)	Statue with side screens and piers	Grade II*	The statue of Emmeline Pankhurst was unveiled on 6 March 1930 by Stanley Baldwin and moved to its present site in 1956. The stone screens were added in 1959 as a memorial to her daughter. Two bronze plaques show, on the right, a portrait medallion of Christabel Pankhurst and, on the left, the design on the WSPU prisoners' badge.
	Prophet of Assembly of the Church of England	Church House, Dean's Yard	c. 1936–1940	Charles Wheeler	Herbert Baker and A. T. Scott	Architectural sculpture	Grade II	
More images	Statue of George V	Old Palace Yard 51.4990°N 0.1263°W	1947 (unveiled)	William Reid Dick	Giles Gilbert Scott	Statue	Grade II	Unveiled 22 October 1947 by George VI. Completion of the statue was delayed by the outbreak of the Second World War; the statue was stored at the quarry in Portland for the duration of the conflict.
More images	Statue of Jan Smuts	Parliament Square 51.5009°N 0.1269°W	1956	Jacob Epstein	possibly Charles Holden	Statue	Grade II	Unveiled 7 November 1956. Winston Churchill, on his return to power in 1951, wished to erect a statue to Smuts; he was, however, unable to perform the unveiling due to illness. The pedestal is of granite from South Africa.
More images	Knife Edge Two Piece 1962–65	Abingdon Street Gardens (College Green) 51.4980°N 0.1260°W	1962–1965	Henry Moore	—N/a	Sculpture	Grade II*	Unveiled 1 November 1967. A gift by Henry Moore and the Contemporary Art Society. Over the years the work's condition deteriorated because its legal owner was unknown. The House of Commons accepted ownership of the sculpture in 2011; it is now part of the Parliamentary Art Collection.
	Christ of the Sacred Heart	Chapel of the Sacred Heart, Horseferry Road	1964	Arthur Fleischmann	Harry G. Clacy	Architectural sculpture	—N/a	
	Man and Woman	Albany House, Petty France	1964	Willi Soukop	D. E. Harrington	Architectural sculpture	—N/a	
More images	Statue of Winston Churchill	Parliament Square 51.5008°N 0.1265°W	1973	Ivor Roberts-Jones	—N/a	Statue	Grade II	Unveiled 1 November 1973 by Clementine, Lady Spencer-Churchill. Churchill indicated his desire for a statue of himself in this spot during Wornum's reconfiguration of Parliament Square. An early version of the statue was felt to bear too close a resemblance to Benito Mussolini and had to be modified.
	Crucifixion	College Garden, Westminster Abbey	1974	Enzo Plazzotta	—N/a	Sculptural group	—N/a	A group depicting the crucified Christ with the Good and Bad Thieves, donated to the Dean and Chapter of Westminster Abbey in 1993.
More images	Jubilee Fountain Silver Jubilee of Elizabeth II	New Palace Yard 51.5005°N 0.1252°W	1977	Walenty Pytel	—N/a	Fountain with sculpture	—N/a	Unveiled 4 May 1977 by Elizabeth II. The two tiers of animals represent the continents: on the lower tier are a lion for Africa, a unicorn for Europe and a tiger for Asia, on the upper an eagle for the Americas, a kangaroo for Australia and a penguin for Antarctica.
	Planned Growth	Rowan House, Greycoat Street	1986–1987	Peter Thursby	Renton Howard Wood Levine	Relief	—N/a	Awarded the Royal Society of British Sculptors' silver medal in 1987.
	Memorial to Innocent Victims of Oppression, Violence and War	Broad Sanctuary 51.4996°N 0.1286°W	1996	?	—N/a	Plaque in pavement	—N/a	Unveiled 10 October 1996 by Elizabeth II.
	Fountain	St John's Gardens	2001	?	?	Fountain	—N/a	A replacement for a 19th-century fountain which had become derelict. Installed as part of the redevelopment of the Westminster Hospital site.
	Golden Jubilee Sundial Golden Jubilee of Elizabeth II	Old Palace Yard 51.4990°N 0.1261°W	2002	Quentin Newark (of Atelier Works)	Incisive Lettering (lettering)	Analemmatic sundial in pavement	—N/a	Parliament's gift to the Queen on her Golden Jubilee. The inscription around the rim is from Henry VI, Part 3: To carve out dials quaintly, point by point, thereby to see the minutes how they run: how many makes the hour full complete, how many hours brings about the day, how many days will finish up the year, how many years a mortal man may live.
	Screens	St John's Gardens	2005	Wendy Ramshaw	—N/a	Metalwork grilles	—N/a	12 grilles set into the existing red brick wall between the gardens and the former Westminster Hospital, commissioned as a Section 106 requirement for the development of the hospital site into upmarket residential accommodation.
More images	Statue of Nelson Mandela	Parliament Square 51.5008°N 0.1265°W	2007	Ian Walters	—N/a	Statue	—N/a	Unveiled 29 August 2007. Westminster City Council had earlier refused permission for placing the statue in Trafalgar Square adjacent to South Africa House. On a visit to London in 1961, Mandela had joked that one day his statue would replace that of Jan Smuts; they now both have statues in Parliament Square.
More images	Statue of David Lloyd George, 1st Earl Lloyd-George of Dwyfor	Parliament Square 51.5008°N 0.1267°W	2007 (unveiled)	Glynn Williams	—N/a	Statue	—N/a	Unveiled 25 October 2007 by the Prince of Wales and Duchess of Cornwall. The bronze figure stands on a plinth of slate from Penrhyn Quarry, North Wales.
More images	Lines for the Supreme Court	Outside the Supreme Court at Middlesex Guildhall	2009	?	—N/a	Inscription on curved wall	—N/a	The complete text of a poem by the Poet Laureate, Andrew Motion, which he also read out at the Supreme Court's opening ceremony.
More images	Statue of Elizabeth I	Little Dean's Yard	2010	Matthew Spender	—N/a	Statue	—N/a	Unveiled 21 May 2010. Commemorates the 450th anniversary of the founding of Westminster School by Elizabeth I. The sculptor (the son of the poet Stephen Spender) is an old boy of the school.
	Memorial to William Vincent	Vincent Square	2010	Karen Newman	—N/a	Plaque with relief sculpture	—N/a	Commissioned by the Vincent Square Residents Association to mark the bicentenary of the square's creation as playing fields for Westminster School, of which Dean Vincent was headmaster. Based on a portrait by William Owen and inscribed ELOQUERE PUER ELOQUERE ("speak out, boy, speak out"), an oft-heard utterance of the Dean's.
	Radial Etch	10 Rochester Row	2010	Oliver Marsden	Assael Architecture	Etched metal panels	—N/a	
	Fruit sculptures	Abbey Orchard Estate courtyard 51.4978°N 0.1311°W	2012	Sarah Staton	—N/a	Sculptures	—N/a	Gigantic sculptures of English fruit, made to appear as if they have fallen from the plane trees nearby. The scheme won the UK Landscape Award for Artworks in 2012.
	Vyner Tree	The Courthouse, Romney Street	2014	Tom Price		Sculptures	—N/a	
More images	Statue of Mahatma Gandhi	Parliament Square 51.5006°N 0.1272°W	2015	Philip Jackson	—N/a	Statue	—N/a	Unveiled 14 March 2015, on the centenary of Gandhi's return to India from South Africa. The statue is based on a photograph of Gandhi at 10 Downing Street, from a 1931 visit to London in which he met Ramsay MacDonald.
More images	Statue of Millicent Fawcett	Parliament Square	2018	Gillian Wearing	—N/a	Statue	—N/a	Unveiled 24 April 2018. Commissioned as part of commemorations of the centenary of the Representation of the People Act 1918.
	Pan African Flag for the Relic Travellers' Alliance (Union)	Westminster tube station	2022	Larry Achiampong		Installation	—N/a	The London Underground roundel in the pan-African colours, with 54 stars representing the countries of Africa.

== Architectural sculpture of Westminster Abbey ==
Image	Title / subject	Location and coordinates	Date	Artist / designer	Architect / other	Type	Designation	Notes
	Statue of Saint Maximilian Kolbe	Above Great West Door	1998	Andrew Tanser		Statue in niche	Grade I	
	Statue of Manche Masemola	Above Great West Door	1998	John Roberts		Statue in niche	Grade I	
	Statue of Archbishop Janani Luwum	Above Great West Door	1998	Neil Simmons		Statue in niche	Grade I	
	Statue of Grand Duchess Elizabeth of Russia	Above Great West Door	1998	John Roberts		Statue in niche	Grade I	
	Statue of Rev. Martin Luther King Jr.	Above Great West Door	1998	Tim Crawley		Statue in niche	Grade I	
	Statue of Archbishop Óscar Romero	Above Great West Door	1998	John Roberts		Statue in niche	Grade I	
	Statue of Dietrich Bonhoeffer	Above Great West Door	1998	Tim Crawley		Statue in niche	Grade I	
	Statue of Esther John	Above Great West Door	1998	Neil Simmons		Statue in niche	Grade I	
	Statue of Lucian Tapiedi	Above Great West Door	1998	Tim Crawley		Statue in niche	Grade I	
	Statue of Wang Zhiming	Above Great West Door	1998	Neil Simmons		Statue in niche	Grade I	

== Works formerly on display outdoors ==
Image	Title / subject	Location and coordinates	Date	Artist / designer	Architect / other	Type	Designation	Notes
	Saint Peter, Saint Paul, Faith and Hope	Formerly in College Garden, Westminster Abbey (removed for conservation, to be displayed in the Triforium by mid-2018) 51.4977°N 0.1273°W	1686	Grinling Gibbons and Artus Quellinus III	—N/a	Statues	Grade II	Four marble statues from the altarpiece of the Catholic chapel at the Palace of Whitehall, commissioned by James II and designed by Christopher Wren. The altarpiece was dismantled after the Whitehall Palace fire of 1695. These fragments are in very poor condition.

== See also ==
- Boadicea and Her Daughters
- Burials and memorials in Westminster Abbey
- Field of Remembrance
- Parliamentary War Memorial
- Statue of Winston Churchill, Palace of Westminster
- Statue of Margaret Thatcher, Palace of Westminster

== Bibliography ==
- Baines, Phil; Dixon, Catherine (2003). Signs: Lettering in the Environment. London: Laurence King Publishing. ISBN 1856693376.
- Black, Jonathan (2013). "Making the Rock of Gibraltar: Ivor Roberts-Jones and the Sir Winston Churchill Commission for Parliament Square (1970–73)". In Jonathan, Black; Ayres, Sara (eds.). Abstraction and Reality: The Sculpture of Ivor Roberts-Jones. London: Philip Wilson Publishers. pp. 63–83. ISBN 978-1781300107.
- Bradley, Simon; Pevsner, Nikolaus (2003). London: Westminster. The Buildings of England. Vol. 6. London and New Haven: Yale University Press. ISBN 978-0-300-09595-1.
- Hall, James (2003). "Auguste Rodin, The Burghers of Calais". In Verdi, Richard (ed.). Saved! 100 Years of the National Art Collections Fund. London: Scala. pp. 128–133. ISBN 9781857593044.
- Ward-Jackson, Philip (2011). Public Sculpture of Historic Westminster: Volume 1. Public Sculpture of Britain. Vol. 14. Liverpool: Liverpool University Press. ISBN 978-1-84631-691-3.
