= Palmer Street =

Street in London, England

Coordinates: 51.4991°N 0.1354°W

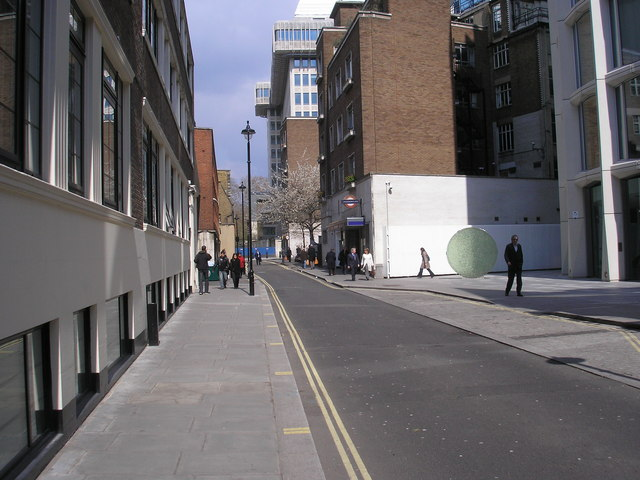
- Palmer Street, looking north

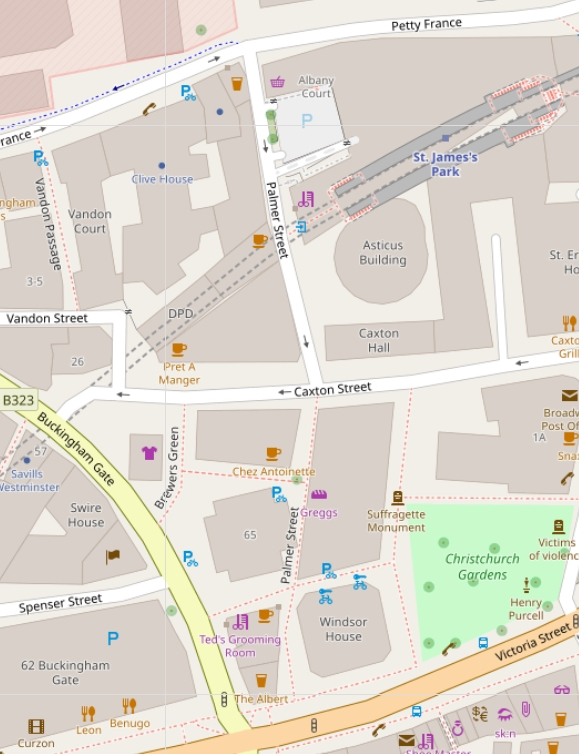
- Map of Palmer Street (centre, vertically)
- Former names: Palmer's Passage (lower) & Gardner's Lane (upper)
- Area: St. James's
- Location: City of Westminster
- Postal code: London SW1H

Other
- Known for: Former offices of GCHQ

Palmer Street is a street in the City of Westminster that runs between Petty France in the north and Victoria Street in the south. It is crossed by Caxton Street and Butler Place. The lower half of Palmer Street, below Caxton Street, is pedestrianised.

The street is named after the priest and philanthropist James Palmer whose almshouses stood on the east side from 1654 to 1881. In the 19th century the lower part was known as Palmer's Passage and the upper part as Gardner's Lane. From 1953 to 2019, the street was the location of the London offices of the British Government Communications Headquarters (GCHQ).

== History ==
The street takes its name from Palmer's Almshouses (1654–1881) which stood on the east side, south of Caxton Street, and were founded by the priest and philanthropist James Palmer (died 1660) to whom there is a monument in Westminster Abbey. Alongside the almshouses, Palmer also started a Blackcoat School in Palmer Street which eventually became part of Westminster City School. A few streets away was Palmer's Village, created by a donation from Palmer in 1655. The almshouses in Palmer Street were demolished in 1881 and the residents moved to United Westminster Almshouses in Rochester Row.

In the 19th century the lower part of the street was known as Palmer's Passage and the upper part as Gardner's Lane. Caxton Street was known as Little Chapel Street. The area is within the City of Westminster's Broadway and Christchurch Gardens Conservation Area.

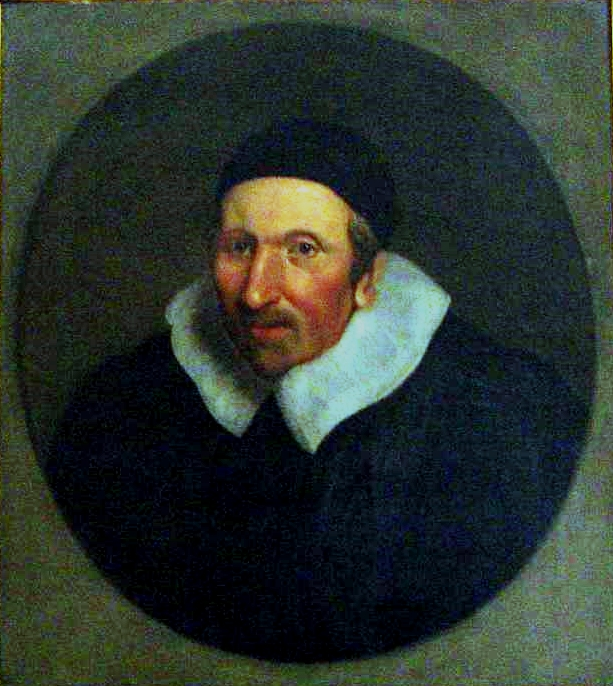
Anonymous portrait of James Palmer

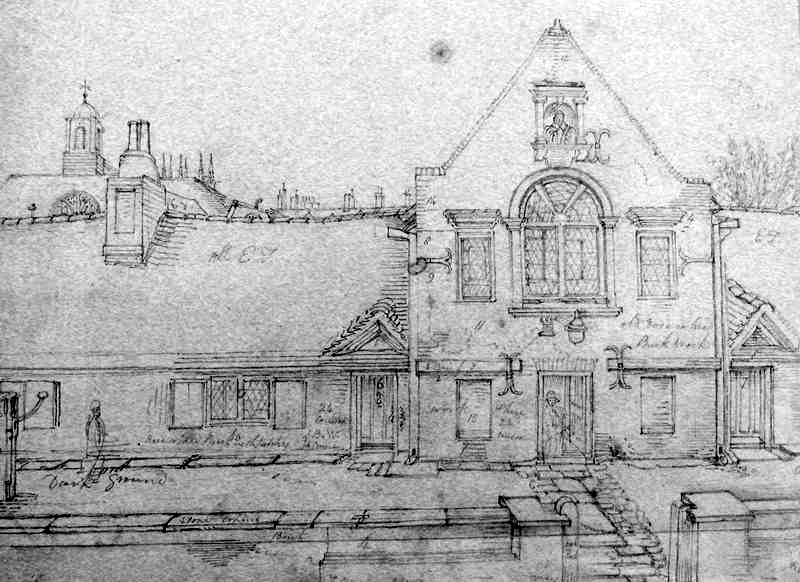
Palmer's Almshouses, William Capon, 1817

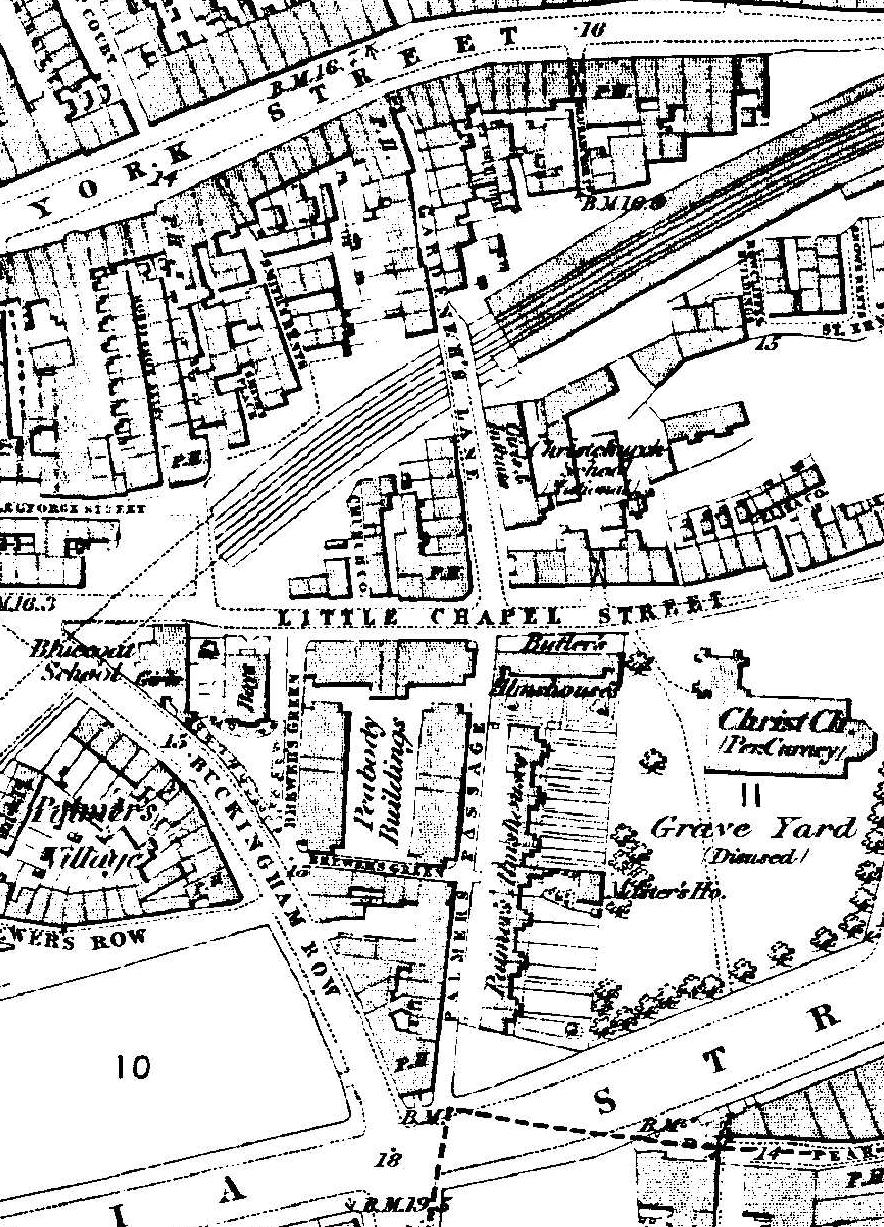
Palmer Street, Ordnance Survey map, 1869–1880

== East side ==
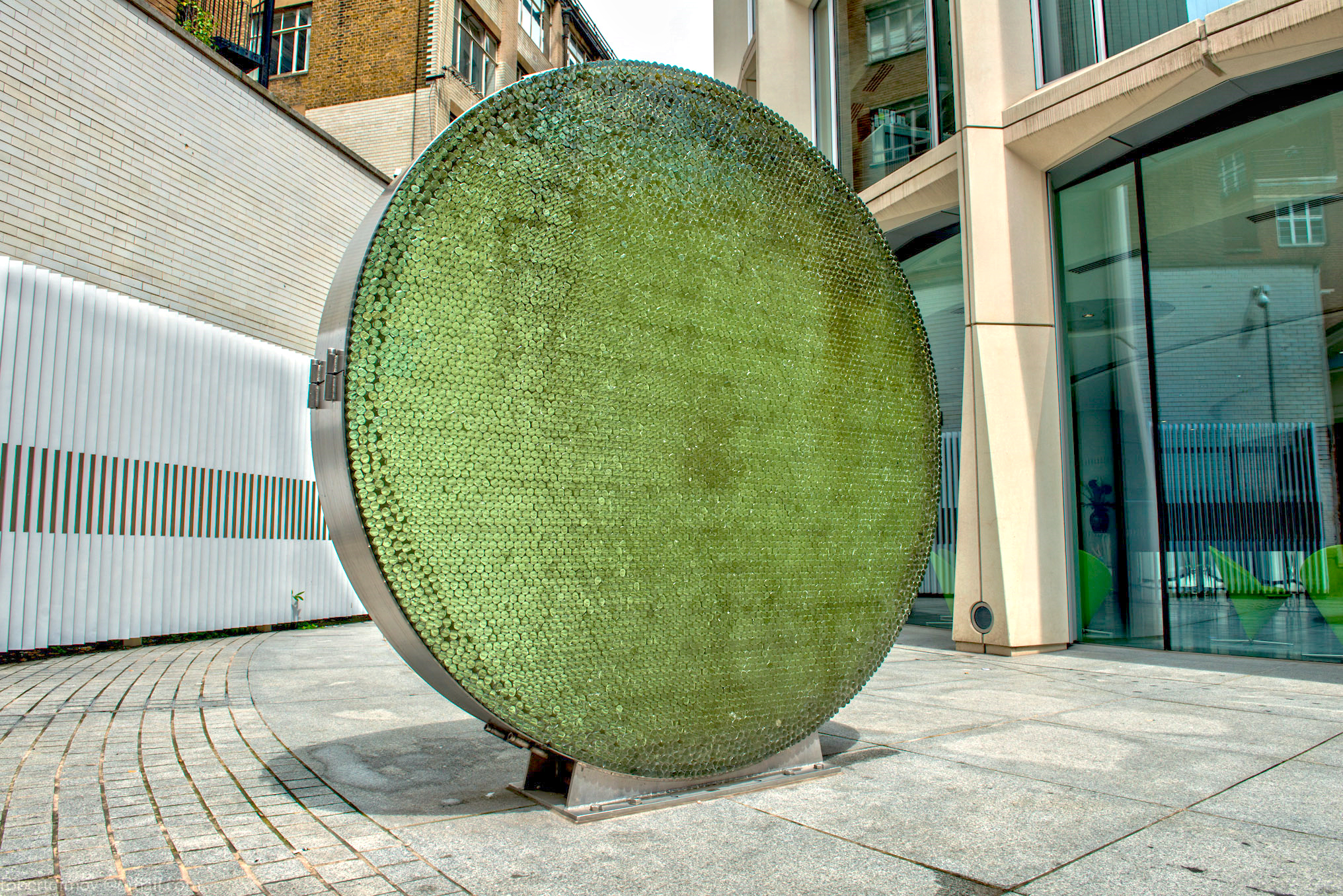
Cypher by Tim Morgan. Glass rods with steel rim, 2004.

At the northern end of the street on the east side is Albany Court and an entrance to St James Park underground station, the lines of which run under Palmer Street.

At number 21 is the cylindrical Asticus Building (2006), built on a site considered so difficult that it had remained undeveloped for 25 years, with Tim Morgan's steel and glass sculpture Cypher (2004) outside, one of three of that work. On the corner with Caxton Street is the grade II listed Caxton Hall.

On the south side of Caxton Street is Christchurch House, where Butler's Almshouses stood in the 19th century, and at the end of the street on the corner with Victoria Street is Windsor House.

== West side ==
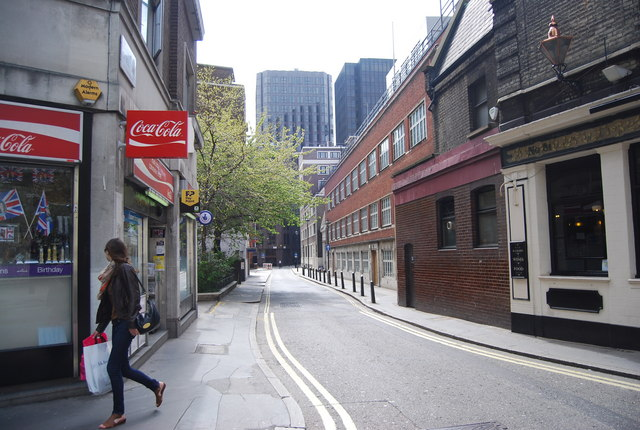
The former offices of GCHQ (the long three-storey red brick building on the right)

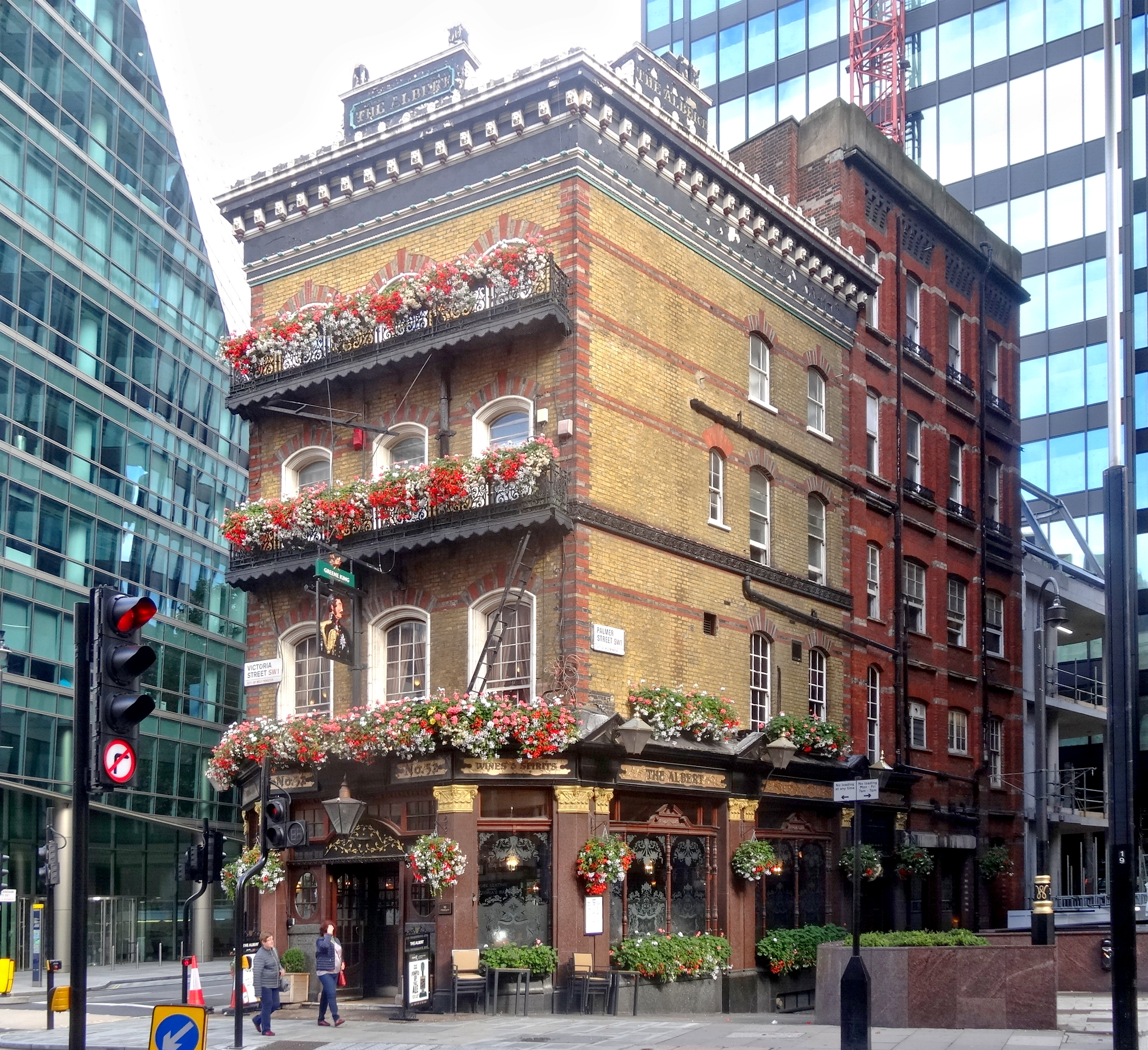
The Albert public house and the south end of Palmer Street (right)

On the west side at the north end on the corner with Petty France is the Adam & Eve public house under the management of Greene King.

Further down at 2–14 is the former London offices of the British Government Communications Headquarters (GCHQ) from 1953 to 2019. The building was newly built when GCHQ moved in. Known as station UKC-1000, it was particularly responsible for the interception of communications such as radio transmissions and telexes from London's embassies. In 1991, the British television documentary series World in Action quoted a GCHQ employee as saying:

Up on the fourth floor there, [GCHQ] has hired a group of carefully vetted British Telecom people... It's nothing to do with national security. It's because it's not legal to take every single telex. And they take everything: the embassies, all the business deals, even the birthday greetings, they take everything. They feed it into the Dictionary.

The Dictionary was a computer program designed to recognise key words of intelligence interest. In 2019, it was reported that GCHQ had vacated the building which had been sold to a private purchaser.

A Starbucks coffee outlet is between the former GCHQ offices and Alliance House, an eight-storey office block at number 12, on the corner with Caxton Street, opened in November 1938, with the demolition of the Westminster Hospital Medical School building, site clearance and construction, all being completed in under 12 months. It is the headquarters of the United Kingdom Alliance temperance movement, with a large meeting room, Alliance Hall, and much of the building let to other companies.

On the other side of Caxton Street are Caxton House and Buckingham Green where Peabody Buildings stood in the 19th century with the grade II listed Albert public house at the end of the street on the corner with Victoria Street.

== See also ==
- St Ermin's Hotel – Nearby with strong connections to the British secret intelligence community.
