= Parliament Square =

Square in London, England

Parliament Square in 2023

Parliament Square is a square at the northwest end of the Palace of Westminster in the City of Westminster in central London, England. Laid out in the 19th century, it features a large open green area in the centre with trees to its west, and it contains twelve statues of statesmen and other notable individuals.

As well as being one of London's tourist attractions, it is also the place where many demonstrations and protests have been held. The square is overlooked by various official buildings: legislature to the east (in the Houses of Parliament), governmental executive offices to the north (on Whitehall), the judiciary to the west (the Supreme Court), and the church to the south (with Westminster Abbey).

Parliament Square sometimes features all of the British flags, the flags of the United Kingdom, its four countries, the county flags and the three flags of the Crown Dependencies and the sixteen heraldic shields of the British Overseas Territories. Alongside all of the British flags, Parliament Square also has all of the 56 flags of the Commonwealth of Nations.

== Location ==
Buildings looking upon the square include the churches Westminster Abbey and St Margaret's, Westminster, the Middlesex Guildhall which is the seat of the Supreme Court of the United Kingdom, Government Offices Great George Street serving HM Treasury and HM Revenue and Customs, and Portcullis House.

Roads that branch off the Parliament Square are St Margaret Street (towards Millbank), Broad Sanctuary (towards Victoria Street), Great George Street (towards Birdcage Walk), Parliament Street (leading into Whitehall) and Bridge Street (leading onto Westminster Bridge).

== History ==
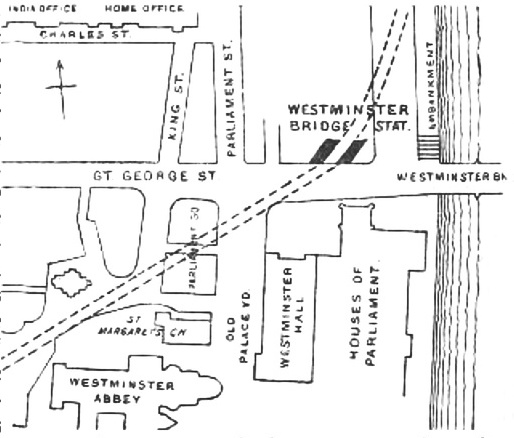
Streets around Parliament Square in 1888

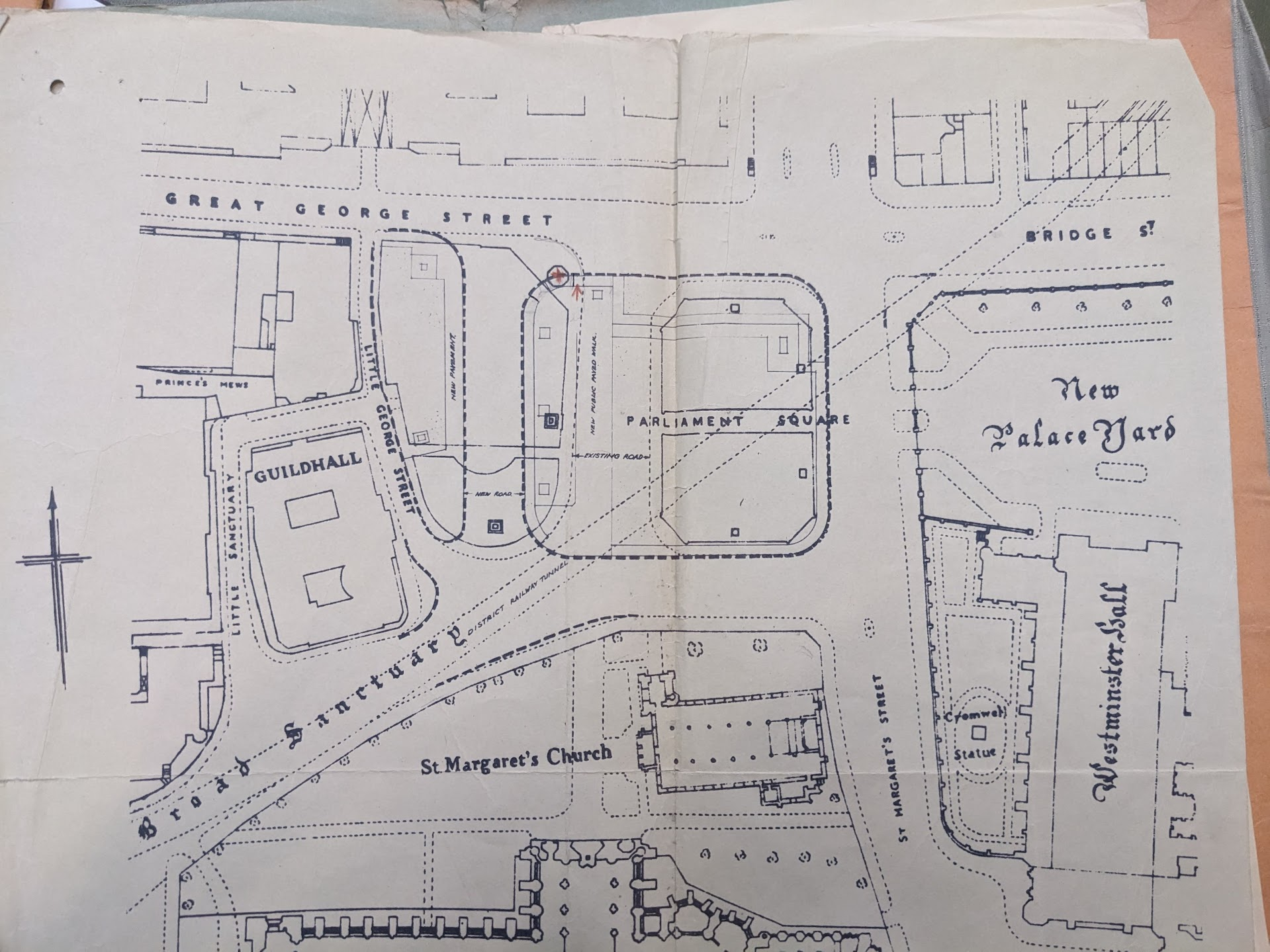
1949 proposed layout of Parliament Square with the former location of the Buxton Memorial Fountain marked in red.

=== Original layout ===
Parliament Square was laid out in 1868 in order to open up the space around the Palace of Westminster and improve traffic flow. A substantial amount of property was cleared from the site, and the architect responsible was Sir Charles Barry. The square originally included the Buxton Memorial Fountain, which was removed in 1949 and relocated to nearby Victoria Tower Gardens in 1957. The square also featured some of London's earliest traffic signals.

In 1949, a redesign of the Parliament Square area was prepared by the architect George Grey Wornum (1888–1957).

=== Post Second World War changes ===
Plans to redesign the square predated the Second World War, with the Ministry of Transport proposing:

that a larger central island was necessary to allow traffic more room in Great George Street. If the northern side of the central island were lengthened it was expected that the frequent traffic blocks at the junction of Parliament Street and Bridge Street with Parliament Square would be greatly reduced.

Parliament Square (Improvements) Act 1949
- Act of Parliament
- Parliament of the United Kingdom
- Long title: An Act to authorise certain improvements in and around Parliament Square, and for purposes connected therewith.
- Citation: 12, 13 & 14 Geo. 6. c. lvi

Dates
- Royal assent: 16 December 1949

Text of statute as originally enacted

Following the war, the London County Council submitted a revised plan that was approved by the Ministry of Transport and enacted by Parliament through the Parliament Square (Improvements) Act 1949 (12, 13 & 14 Geo. 6. c. lvi). The Act was required due to the mixed ownership of the land. The redesign included new roads, pavements, and landscaping works in the area.

As Great George Street was widened and an existing road realigned, the Buxton Memorial Fountain had to be removed. Because Victorian architecture was unpopular at the time, some Members of Parliament argued that it should not be re-erected; at least one described it as having "no artistic merit whatever". The Act ultimately permitted its removal but required its reinstatement.

The central garden of the square was transferred from the Parliamentary Estate to the control of the Greater London Authority under the Greater London Authority Act 1999. The Authority is responsible for lighting, cleansing, watering, paving, and maintenance of the garden, and has powers to make bylaws for its management.

== Public demonstrations ==
The east side of the square, lying opposite one of the main entrances to the Palace of Westminster, has historically been a common site of protest against government action or inaction.

=== Reclaim the Streets ===
On May Day 2000 the square was transformed into a giant allotment by a Reclaim the Streets guerrilla gardening action.

=== Parliament Square Peace Campaign ===
Brian Haw staged a continual protest there for several years, campaigning against British and American action in Iraq. Starting on 2 June 2001, Haw left his post only once, on 10 May 2004 – and then because he had been arrested on the charge of failing to leave the area during a security alert – and returned the following day when he was released. The alleged disruption caused by Haw's protest led Parliament to insert a clause into the Serious Organised Crime and Police Act 2005 (SOCPA) making it illegal to protest in Parliament Square (or, indeed, in a large area reaching roughly half a mile in all directions) without first obtaining the permission of the Metropolitan Police Commissioner.

As well as sparking a great deal of protest from various groups on the grounds of infringement of civil liberties including the European Convention on Human Rights, the Serious Organised Crime and Police Act 2005 was initially unsuccessful in accomplishing its goals: Brian Haw was held to be exempt from needing authorisation in a High Court ruling, as his protest had started before the act came into effect (though any new protests would be covered); Haw remained in Parliament Square. Later, the Court of Appeal overturned this ruling, forcing Haw to apply for police authorisation to continue his protest.

The provisions of that act relating to Parliament Square were repealed by the Police Reform and Social Responsibility Act 2011, which provides for a different regime of "prohibited activities".

The Parliament Square Peace Campaign was a peace campaign started by Brian Haw in 2001 and carried on by Barbara Tucker until 2013.

=== Democracy Village ===
In May 2010, a peace camp known as Democracy Village was set up on the square to protest (initially) against the British government's involvement in invasions in the Middle East, which became an eclectic movement encompassing left-wing causes and anti-globalisation protests.

The Mayor of London Boris Johnson appealed to the courts to have them removed and, after demonstrators lost an appeal in July 2010, Lord Neuberger ruled that the protesters camping on the square should be evicted. The final tents were removed in January 2012.

=== Palestine Action ===
On 9 August 2025, a large demonstration in support of Palestine Action was held at Parliament Square. When Big Ben chimed 1 p.m. during the protest, large numbers of demonstrators revealed signs which read "I oppose genocide. I support Palestine Action", leading to the arrest of 532 people—the largest made by the Metropolitan Police on a single day in the previous 10 years.

== Statues ==
The Parliament Square is home to twelve statues of British, Commonwealth, and Anglosphere political figures. They are listed here in anti-clockwise order, beginning with Winston Churchill's statue, which faces Parliament.

Image	Subject Provenance	Location Grid reference	Sculptor	Date of unveiling	Article Notes	Listing
	Winston Churchill Prime Minister 1940–1945 and 1951–1955	North-eastern edge of the green 51.5008°N 0.1265°W	Ivor Roberts-Jones	1 November 1973	Statue of Winston Churchill, Parliament Square Unveiled by Clementine, Baroness Spencer-Churchill. Churchill indicated his desire for a statue of himself in this spot when Parliament Square was redeveloped in the 1950s. Roberts-Jones's initial versions of the statue were felt to bear too close a resemblance to Benito Mussolini.	Grade II
	David Lloyd George Prime Minister 1916–1922	Northern edge of the green	Glynn Williams	25 November 2007	Statue of David Lloyd George, Parliament Square Unveiled by the Prince of Wales and Duchess of Cornwall. Stands on a plinth of slate from Penrhyn Quarry, North Wales.	—
	Jan Smuts Prime Minister of South Africa 1919–1924 and 1939–1948	Northern edge of the green 51.5009°N 0.1269°W	Sir Jacob Epstein	7 November 1956	Statue of Jan Smuts, Parliament Square Winston Churchill, on his return to power in 1951, wished to erect a statue to Smuts; he was, however, unable to perform the unveiling due to illness. The pedestal is of granite from South Africa.	Grade II
	Henry John Temple, 3rd Viscount Palmerston Prime Minister 1855–1858 and 1859–1865	North-western edge of the green 51.5009°N 0.1271°W	Thomas Woolner	2 February 1876	Statue of Lord Palmerston, Parliament Square Palmerston is portrayed in middle age, before he became prime minister. The pedestal departs from the "Gothic" model of the nearby statues of Derby and Peel.	Grade II
	Edward Smith-Stanley, 14th Earl of Derby Prime Minister 1852, 1858–1859 and 1866–1868	North-western edge of the green 51.5008°N 0.1273°W	Matthew Noble	11 July 1874	Statue of the Earl of Derby, Parliament Square Derby is represented wearing his robes as Chancellor of Oxford University. The bronze reliefs around the pedestal depicting scenes from his life were executed by Noble's assistant, Horace Montford.	Grade II
	Benjamin Disraeli, 1st Earl of Beaconsfield Prime Minister 1868 and 1874–1880	Western edge of the green 51.5006°N 0.1273°W	Mario Raggi	19 April 1883	Statue of Benjamin Disraeli, Parliament Square The statue was the "shrine" of the Primrose League, a conservative association established in Disraeli's memory, who left wreaths in front of it every year on "Primrose Day", the anniversary of his death.	Grade II
	Sir Robert Peel Prime Minister 1834–1835 and 1841–1846	Western edge of the green 51.5005°N 0.1273°W	Matthew Noble	1877	Statue of Robert Peel, Parliament Square Initially a statue of Peel was commissioned from Carlo Marochetti. This was ready by 1853 but was considered to be far too large. Marochetti produced a smaller work which was placed at the entrance to New Palace Yard; this was removed in 1868 and melted down in 1874.	Grade II
	George Canning Foreign Secretary 1807–1809 and 1822–1827; Prime Minister 1827	At the square's junction with Great George Street 51.5010°N 0.1277°W	Sir Richard Westmacott	2 May 1832	Statue of George Canning, Parliament Square Originally erected in New Palace Yard; in its current location since 1949. The features are based on the portrait bust of Canning by Sir Francis Chantrey, who was "not at all pleased with the preference shewn to Mr. Westmacott".	Grade II
	Abraham Lincoln President of the United States 1861–1865	In front of the Middlesex Guildhall 51.5006°N 0.1278°W	Augustus Saint-Gaudens	July 1920	Abraham Lincoln: The Man A recasting of the statue in Lincoln Park, Chicago. This statue was unveiled by Prince Arthur, Duke of Connaught, after being ceremonially presented by the American ambassador and accepted by Prime Minister David Lloyd George. Initially the statue was to be erected in 1914, but this was postponed. By that time some favoured an alternative statue by George Grey Barnard, which was eventually erected in Manchester.	Grade II
	Nelson Mandela President of South Africa 1994–1999	South-western edge of the green 51.5008°N 0.1265°W	Ian Walters	29 August 2007	Statue of Nelson Mandela, Parliament Square Westminster Council had earlier refused permission for placing the statue in Trafalgar Square adjacent to South Africa House. The statue was unveiled by Prime Minister Gordon Brown in the presence of Wendy Woods, the widow of Donald Woods, a late anti-apartheid campaigner, and the British actor, director and long-time friend of Woods, Richard Attenborough.	—
	Mahatma Gandhi Indian Independence Leader	Western edge of the green 51.50057°N 0.12724°W	Philip Jackson	14 March 2015	Statue of Mahatma Gandhi, Parliament Square The statue of the Indian independence movement leader Mahatma Gandhi is based on a photograph of Gandhi standing outside the offices of Prime Minister of the United Kingdom Ramsay MacDonald in 1931. It was unveiled by Indian Finance Minister Arun Jaitley on 14 March 2015. The statue was dedicated as a commemoration of the centennial of Gandhi's return to India from South Africa, which is generally regarded as the commencement of his efforts for Indian independence. Speakers at the unveiling of the statue included Prime Minister of the United Kingdom David Cameron, Indian film star Amitabh Bachchan and Gandhi's grandson Gopalkrishna Gandhi.	—
	Millicent Fawcett Campaigner for women's suffrage	North-western edge of the green 51.50083°N 0.12738°W	Gillian Wearing	24 April 2018	Statue of Millicent Fawcett Erected in conjunction with the centenary of women being granted the vote in the UK, following a campaign led by Caroline Criado-Perez, this is the first statue of a woman to be included in Parliament Square. It is by Gillian Wearing, making her the first woman to create a statue that stands in Parliament Square. Dame Millicent was a prominent leader during the campaign for women's suffrage, serving as president of the National Union of Women's Suffrage Societies for more than twenty years, as well as co-founding Newnham College, Cambridge. This statue depicts her as a 50-year-old, the age at which she became president of the National Union of Women's Suffrage Societies. The banner her statue holds reads: "Courage Calls to Courage Everywhere", an extract from a speech she made after the death of suffragette Emily Wilding Davison.	—

== Panorama ==
Panoramic view from the centre of Parliament Square in June 2009 (left to right): Government offices; the Elizabeth Tower and the Palace of Westminster; St Margaret's and Westminster Abbey; Middlesex Guildhall of the Supreme Court.
