= Statue of Jan Smuts, Parliament Square =

Sculpture by Jacob Epstein in London

Statue of Jan Smuts
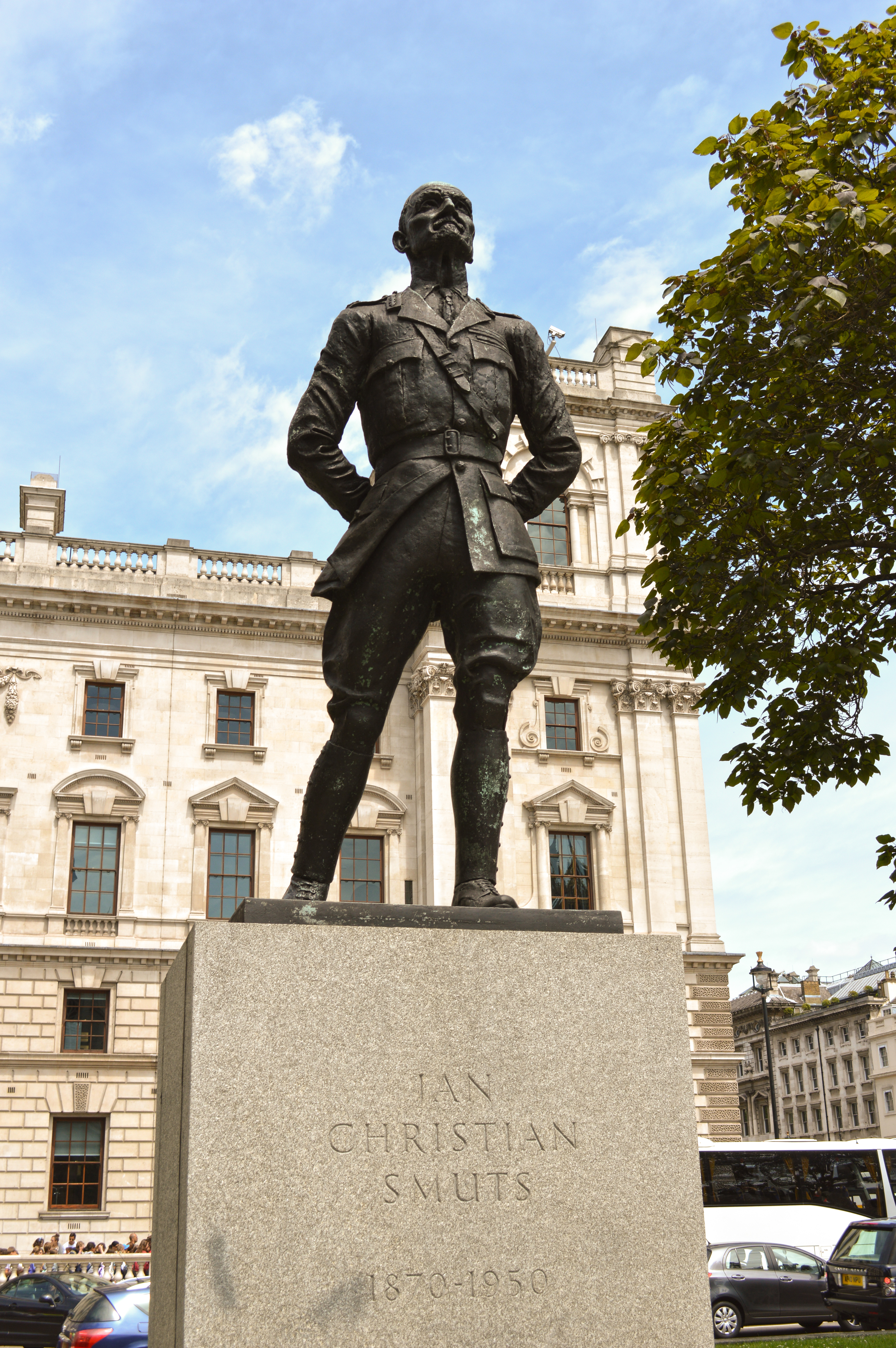
- The statue in 2013
- Artist: Jacob Epstein
- Medium: Bronze sculpture
- Subject: Jan Smuts
- Location: London, United Kingdom; 51°30′03″N 0°07′37″W

A life-size bronze statue of Jan Smuts by the British artist Jacob Epstein stands on the north side of Parliament Square in London, United Kingdom, between a statue of Lord Palmerston and a statue of David Lloyd George.

== Description ==
The statue depicts him in his military uniform as a field marshal, leaning forward with his left leg advanced, as if walking forward. The statue stands on a pedestal of granite from South Africa, which bears the inscription JAN/ CHRISTIAN/ SMUTS/ 1870–1950.

The statue had a mixed reception, with Robert Brand calling it "simply ghastly" after attending the unveiling. Bullus and Asprey in The Statues of London likened Smuts' pose to ice skating.

== History ==
After Winston Churchill won the general election in October 1951, he proposed erecting a statue in Parliament Square as a memorial to Smuts, who had died in September 1950. Churchill retired as prime minister in 1955, and was too ill to perform the unveiling in November 1956; it was unveiled instead by the Speaker of the House of Commons, William Morrison. The statue became a Grade II listed building in 1970.

Nelson Mandela secretly visited London in the 1960s, and on seeing the statue joked with Oliver Tambo that perhaps there would be statues of them replacing it one day. Though the statue of Smuts remains, a statue of Nelson Mandela was unveiled in Parliament Square in 2007.

== See also ==
- List of sculptures by Jacob Epstein
