= St Stephen's Church, Rochester Row =

Historic church in London

Coordinates: 51.4952°N 0.1356°W

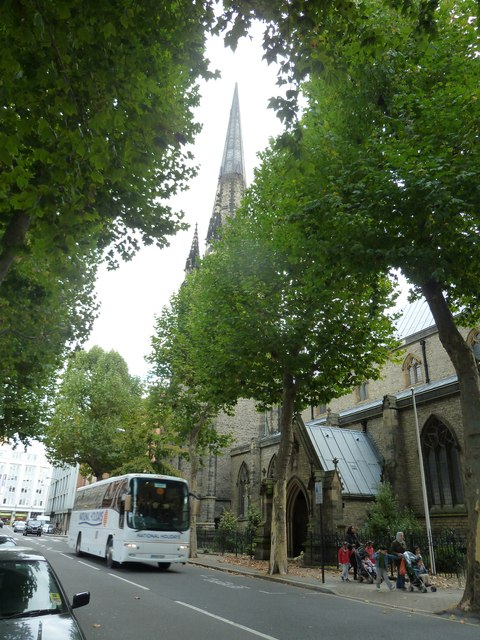
Entrance to St Stephen's with St John

The Church of St Stephen in Rochester Row, London, is a grade II* listed building.

The architect was Benjamin Ferrey and the foundation stone was laid on 20 July 1847. The completed church was consecrated with great ceremony on 24 June 1850, the Festival of the nativity of St John the Baptist.

Angela Burdett-Coutts, the philanthropist, donated major funding for the building of the church.

Owing to bomb damage suffered in 1941 by St John's, Smith Square, its parish was united with St Stephen's on 24 November 1950, becoming the parish of St Stephen's with St John's.

On 9 June 2022, Prince William, Duke of Cambridge, sold The Big Issue on Rochester Row opposite and outside of the Church of St Stephen.

The organ, dating from 1903, is a fine example of the Leeds organ builder James Jepson Binns and consists of two manuals and pedals.
