= James Palmer (priest) =

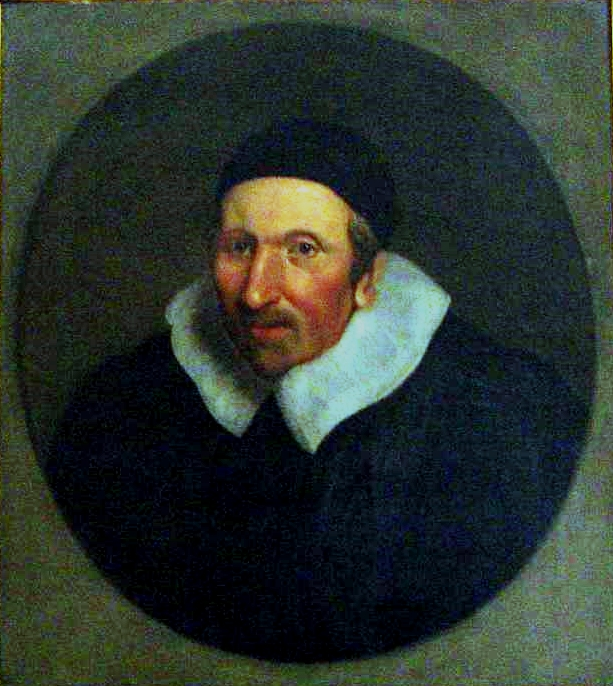
James Palmer

James Palmer (died 1660) was a priest and philanthropist who is remembered in a bust at Westminster Abbey and in the name of Palmer Street. In 1655 he founded what became known as Palmer's Village in London. The village was consolidated in Rochester Row in 1882 and named The United Westminster Almshouses.
