= Statue of Robert Peel, Parliament Square =

Sculpture in London by Matthew Noble

Robert Peel
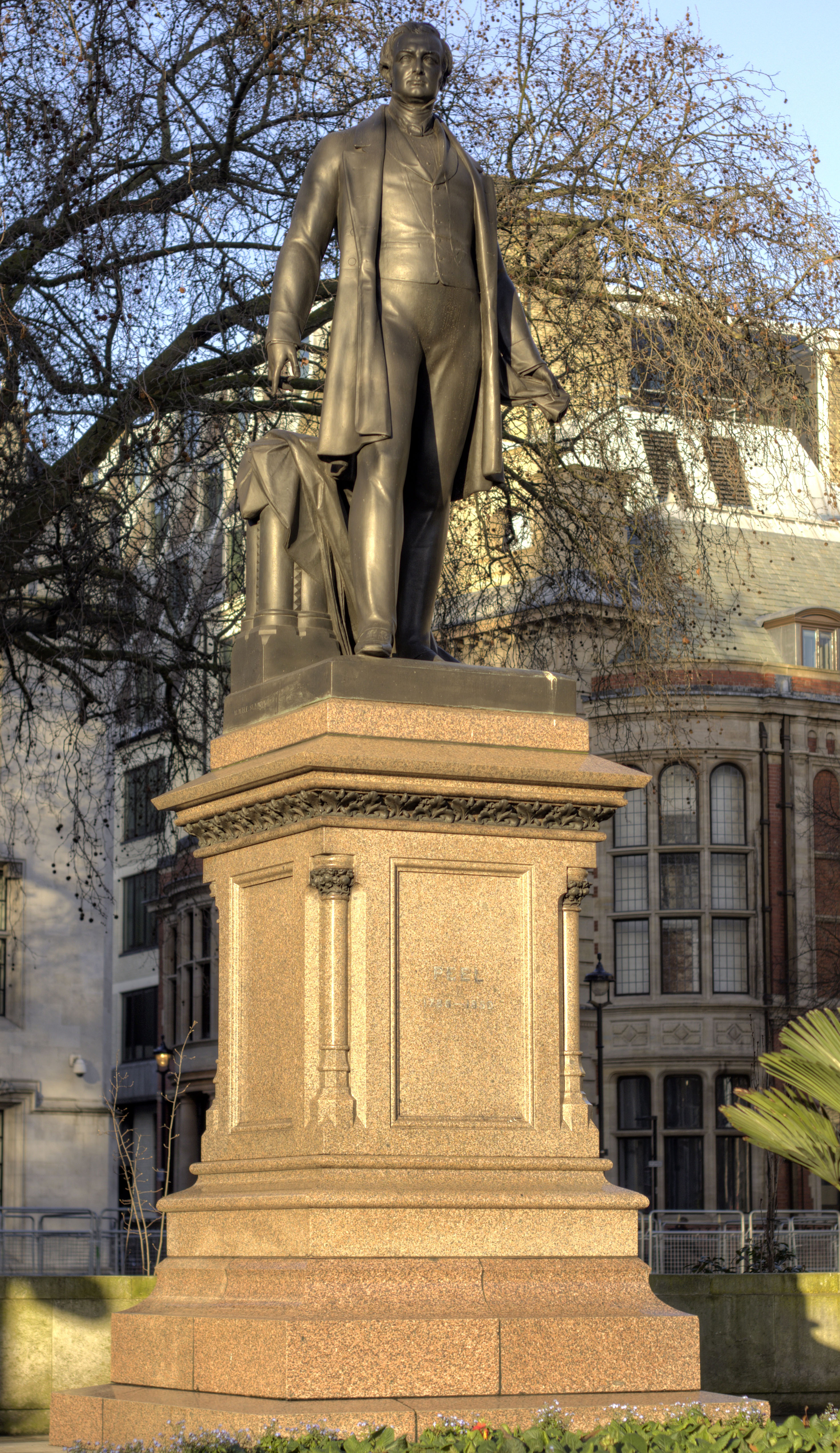
- The statue in 2015
- Artist: Matthew Noble
- Year: 1876; 150 years ago
- Type: Statue
- Medium: Bronze
- Subject: Robert Peel
- Location: London, SW1 United Kingdom; 51.5005°N 0.1273°W

The statue of Robert Peel in Parliament Square, London, is a bronze sculpture of Sir Robert Peel, a former prime minister of the United Kingdom. It was sculpted by Matthew Noble and was one of the first three statues to be placed in the square.

== Description ==
The statue of Sir Robert Peel by sculptor Matthew Noble stands in Parliament Square facing Great George Street in the south-west corner of the square. It is a bronze statue on a granite plinth, and is Grade II listed.

== History ==
In 1871, it was proposed that three statues of Sir Robert Peel, Edward Smith-Stanley, 14th Earl of Derby and Henry John Temple, 3rd Viscount Palmerston should be erected. Following a report to HM Treasury, it was identified that the two gardens forming Parliament Square could be adjusted so that it could accommodate 18 statues in total. It was originally proposed to build all the plinths at once, and leaving them unoccupied until statues were completed.

The statue of Sir Robert Peel was the last work by Noble to be completed: he died on 23 June 1876. The statue was cast at Cox and Son's foundry in Thames Ditton in September 1876. The granite plinth had already been completed on site, and it was hoped at the time that the statue would be in place by the end of the year. There was no ceremony to unveil the statue in December 1876 at the request of the committee. It was the third of the group of statues to be placed in Parliament Square. Following the placement of the statue of Robert Peel in the square, it was considered that it might be appropriate to add further statues of statesmen because of the location next to the Houses of Parliament.

In June 2020, the statue was vandalized during the George Floyd protests and a petition was created demanding its removal because Peel founded the Metropolitan Police Service. The statue was not removed.

== See also ==
- 1876 in art
- List of public art in Westminster
