= Asticus Building =

Building in London, England

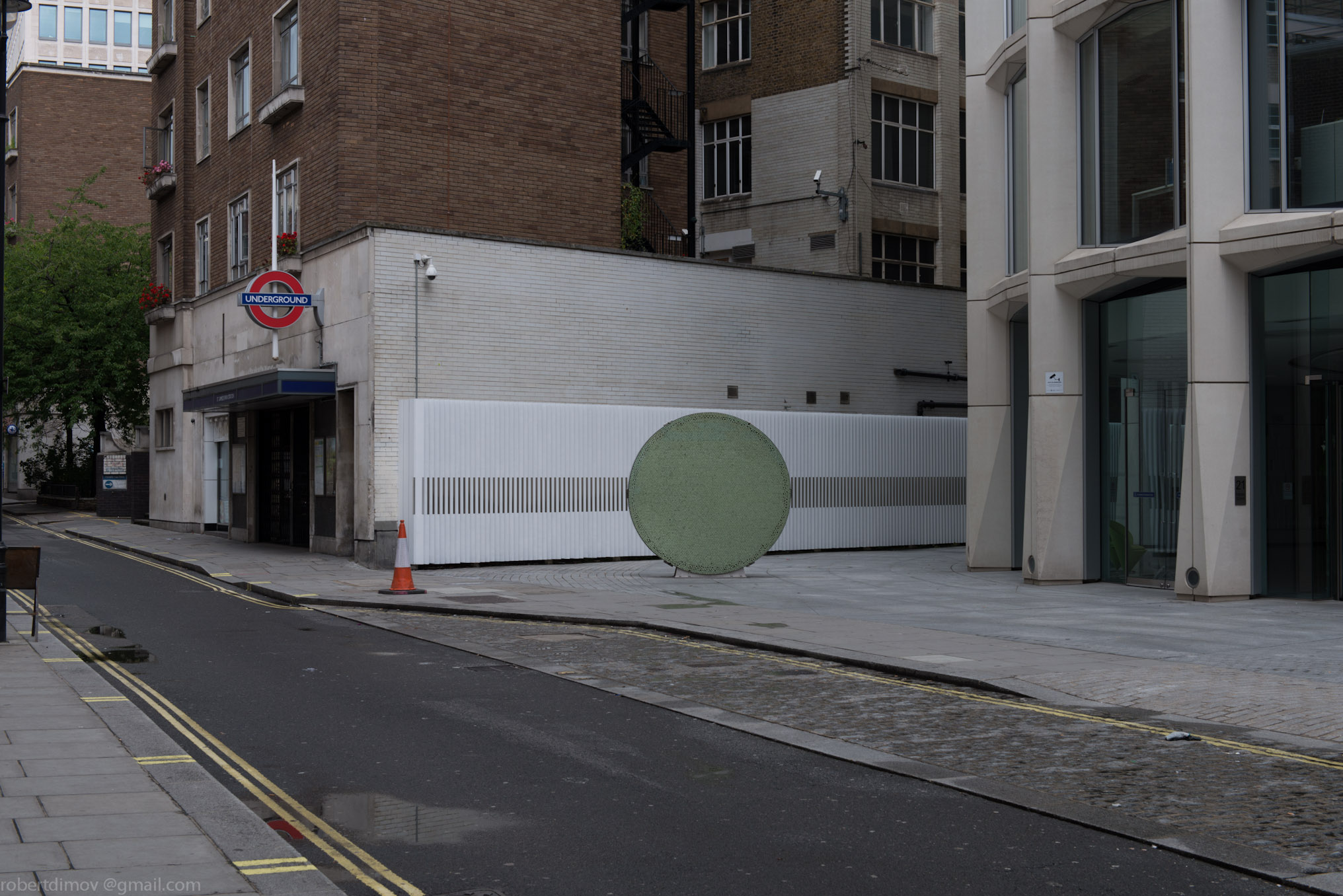
- Asticus Building (right) with Cypher
- Interactive map of the Asticus Building area

General information
- Location: 21 Palmer Street, Westminster, United Kingdom
- Coordinates: 51.4988°N 0.1351°W
- Current tenants: The Work Foundation
- Opened: 2006
- Cost: £80m
- Owner: Axa Investment Managers

Design and construction
- Architecture firm: Lifschutz Davidson Sandilands

The Asticus Building is an architecturally notable building at 21 Palmer Street in the City of Westminster, London.

The building was designed by architects Lifschutz Davidson Sandilands with a cylindrical shape on a concrete frame in order to maximise light due to the proximity of nearby buildings. The nearby buildings, rising to up to seven storeys, made the site so difficult that it had remained undeveloped for 25 years despite its prime location. A "blister" structure at the rear in a sheltered corner was used to house core services in order to maximise usable space and avoid an awkward floor layout. The building was completed in 2006.

Tenants include The Work Foundation. Outside the entrance is Tim Morgan's steel and glass sculpture Cypher (2004), one of three of that work.

In 2016 it was purchased by Axa Investment Managers for £80m.
