= Tim Morgan =

English sculptor

- Born: 1970 (age 55–56); Kent, UK
- Education: Ravensbourne College (1989–90); Edinburgh College of Art (1990–91 and 1996–98); Royal College of Art (1999–2000)
- Known for: Sculpture
- Notable work: Cypher (2004); Vein (2008); Aurora
- Elected: Member Royal Society of Sculptors
- Website: Official website

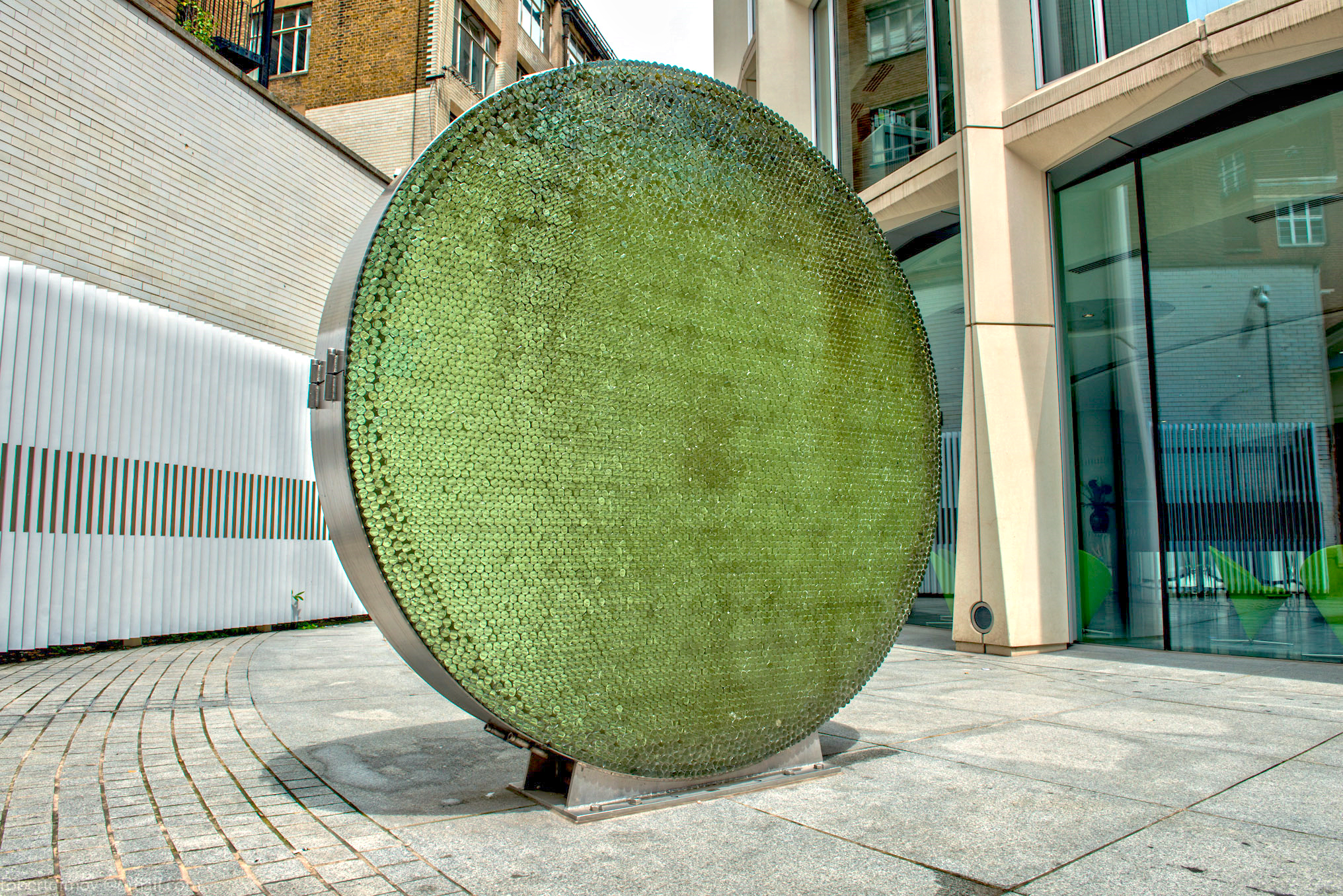
Cypher by Tim Morgan. Glass rods with steel rim, 2004.

Tim Morgan MRSS (born 1970) is an English sculptor, and a member since 2014 of the Royal Society of Sculptors. Morgan is known for his large-scale steel and glass sculptures such as Vein and Aurora that investigate the properties of light passing through glass.

== Early life ==
Tim Morgan was born in Kent in 1970. He received his art training at Ravensbourne College (1989–90), Edinburgh College of Art (1990–91 and 1996–98), where he received the Andrew Grant Postgraduate Scholarship, and the Royal College of Art, London (1999–2000) where he won the Borders Group Prize.

== Career ==
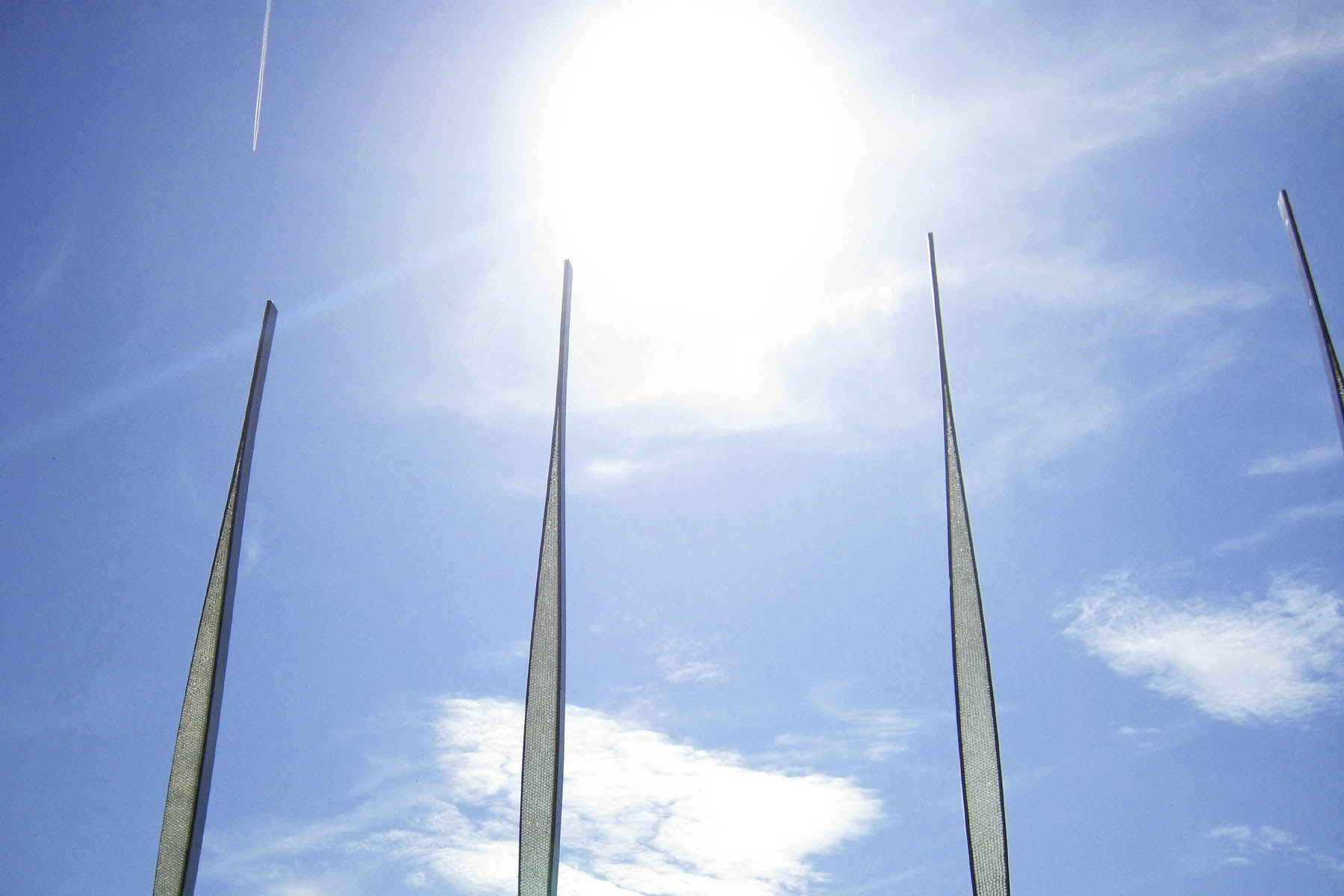
Elements of Vein (2006) at the Cass Sculpture Foundation

Morgan works principally with steel and glass in large pieces that are designed to be displayed outside where they may interact with changing light and weather conditions. His sculpture Cypher (2004) consists of a large disc of glass rods held together by a steel band. One of three of the works is installed at the Asticus Building at 21 Palmer Street in London, on the opposite side of the street to the former headquarters until 2019 of the Government Communications Headquarters.

His Vein (2008) consists of glass rods, held in compression between long steel blades. There are 40 Veins, some of which are on display at the Cass Sculpture Foundation at Goodwood.

His Aurora in Cavendish Square, London, consists of thousands of glass rods sandwiched between two pieces of yellow painted steel that form one continuous band but create the illusion of being two separate pieces. The work was installed as part of the City of Westminster's City of Sculpture project, launched in 2010 to promote public art before the London 2012 Olympics.

In 2014, Morgan was elected to membership of the Royal Society of Sculptors.

He has been commissioned by a number of societies including the Contemporary Arts Society and the Cass Sculpture Foundation. Morgan has in addition been an invited artist at Edinburgh's Royal Scottish Academy Visual Arts.

== Personal life ==
In 2006–07, Morgan rode his motorbike 23,000 miles from Montreal, Canada, to Buenos Aires, Argentina. He lives in France with his wife Nushka and their daughter.
