= Statue of Benjamin Disraeli, Parliament Square =

Statue by Mario Raggi in London

Statue of Benjamin Disraeli
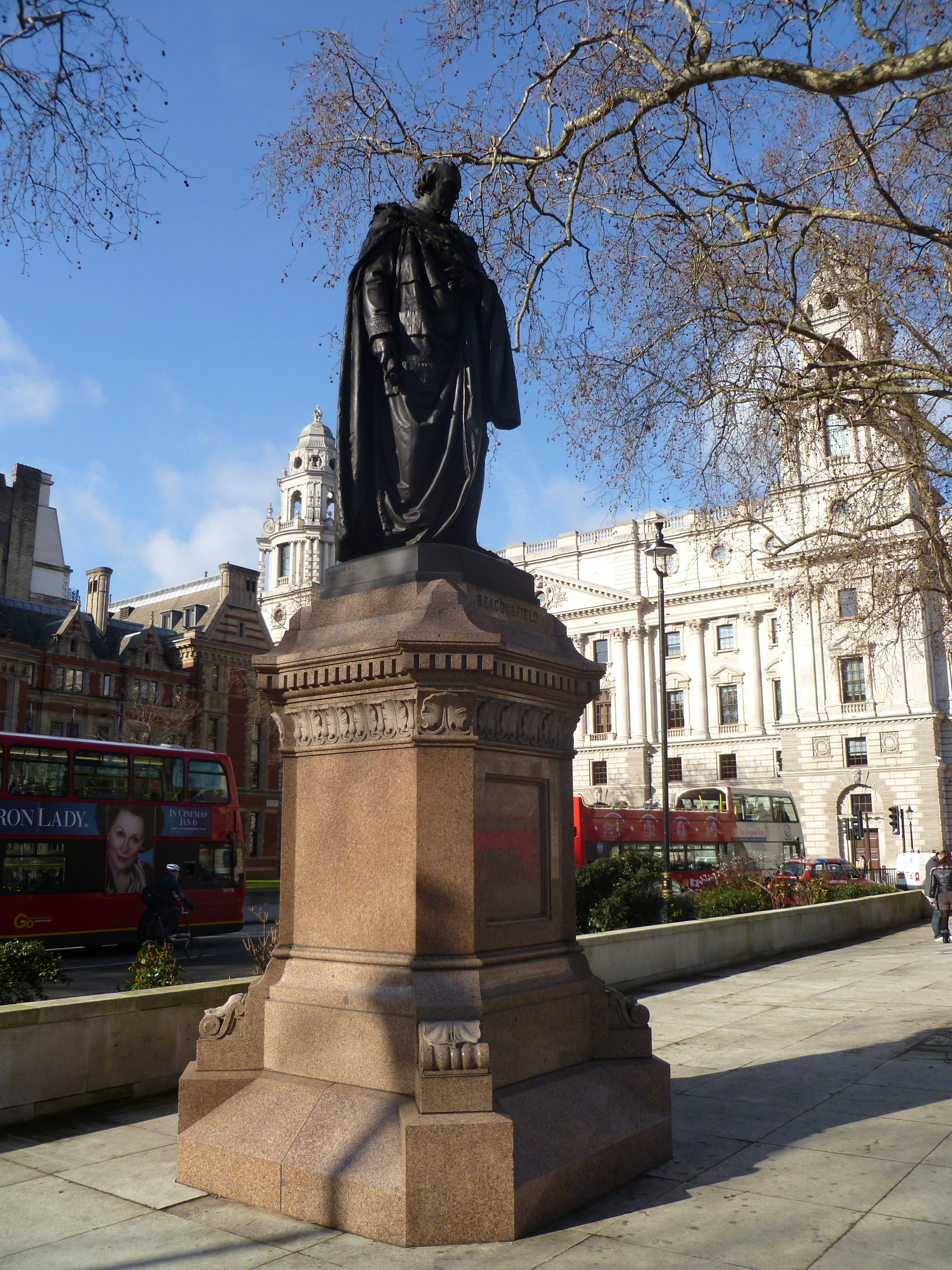
- The statue in 2012
- Artist: Mario Raggi
- Year: 1883
- Medium: Bronze statue, red granite plinth
- Subject: Benjamin Disraeli
- Designation: Grade II
- Location: London, United Kingdom; 51°30′02″N 0°07′38″W

The statue of Benjamin Disraeli is an outdoor bronze sculpture by Mario Raggi, located at the west side of Parliament Square in London. It was unveiled in 1883 and became a Grade II listed building in 1970.

== Description and history ==
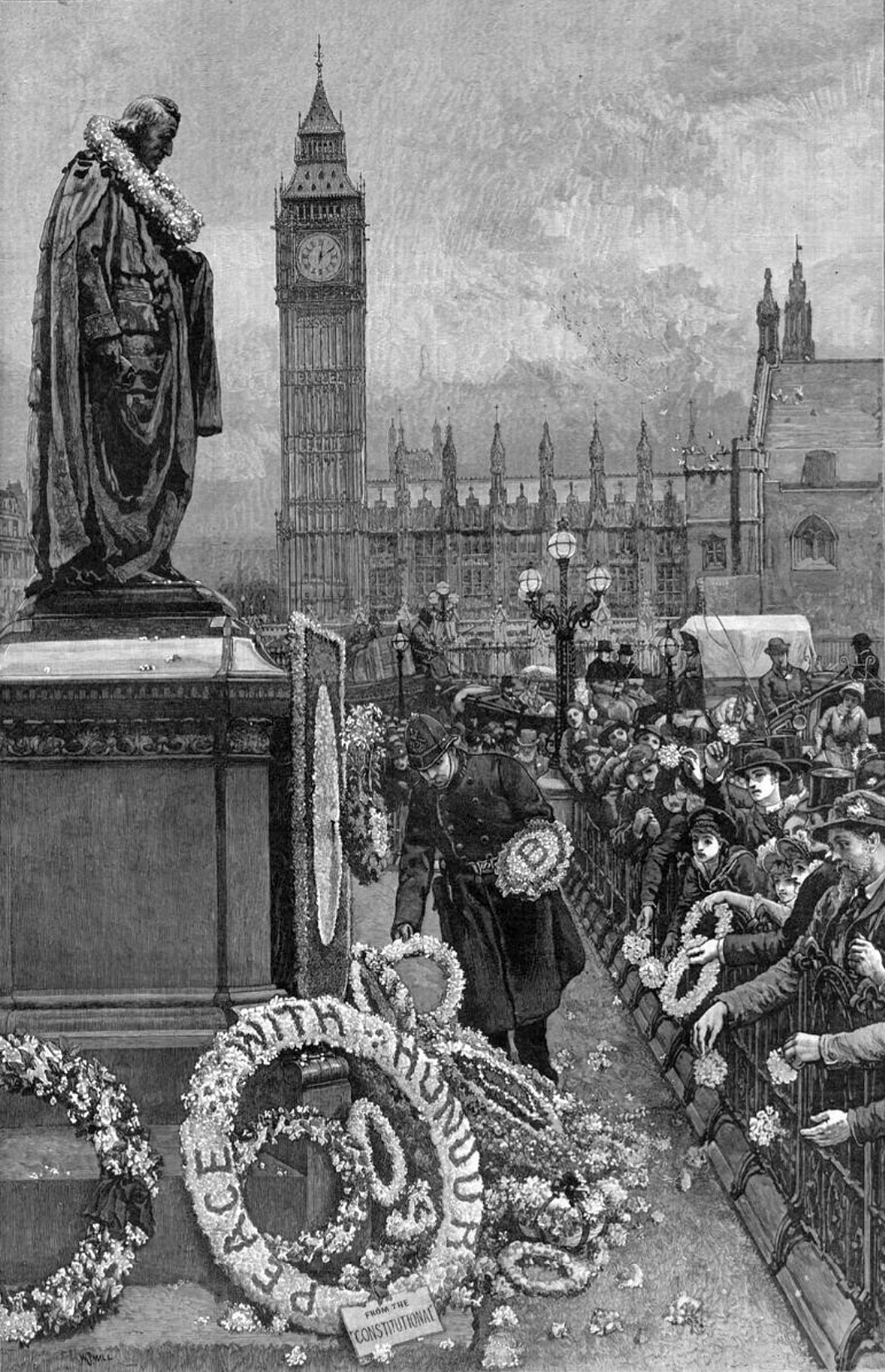
Wood engraving of the statue decorated with primroses on 19 April, Primrose Day, commemorating the anniversary of Disraeli's death, by W. Saull, published in Harper's Bazaar, 1886

The memorial features a bronze statue of the former prime minister Benjamin Disraeli, dressed in his robes as 1st Earl of Beaconsfield, standing on a red granite pedestal. At the front, immediately below the statue, the pedestal bears the inscription "BEACONSFIELD", and the rear face has the inscription "BENJAMIN DISRAELI / EARL OF BEACONSFIELD / K.G. / 1804 – 1881".

The statue was made by Mario Raggi (sometimes known as Mario Razzi or Rossi) and cast by H. Young & Co, art founders of Pimlico. It was recognised as a good likeness, based on a bust that Raggi had made before Disraeli's death. The monument was unveiled by Sir Stafford Northcote, Disraeli's successor as leader of the Conservative Party, on the second anniversary of Disraeli's death, 19 April 1883, a date which became known as Primrose Day. For many years, into the 1920s, arrangements of primroses, reputedly Disraeli's favourite flower, were left at the memorial to commemorate the anniversary of his death.

Originally sited on the south side of the square facing south towards St Margaret's, Westminster, it was moved when the square was reconfigured in the 1950s, and resited in its present location, on the west side of the square facing east towards the Houses of Parliament. The statue became a Grade II listed building in 1970.
