= The Albert =

Pub in Victoria, London

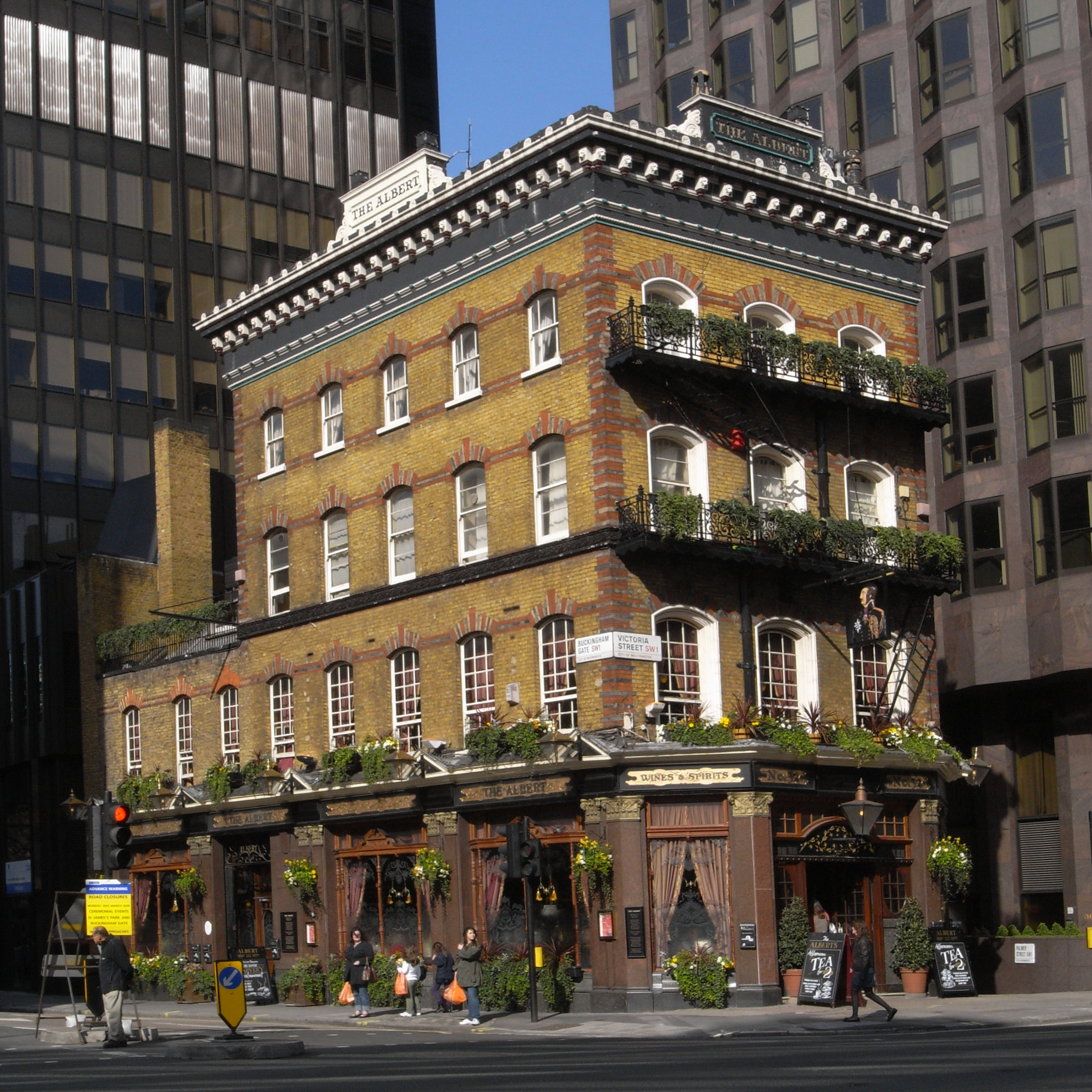
- The Albert

- Location within City of Westminster Location within Greater London

General information
- Location: 52 Victoria Street, Victoria, London, England
- Coordinates: 51.497574°N 0.135388°W
- Completed: 1862

Design and construction
- Developer: Artillery Brewery
- Designations

Listed Building – Grade II
- Designated: October 31, 1973
- Reference no.: 1066148

Website
- Official website

The Albert is a Grade II listed pub located at 52 Victoria Street in Victoria, London, about 0.4 miles (0.64 km) southwest of Westminster Abbey. Built in 1862 by the Artillery Brewery, the pub retains its striking façade and Victorian features that were undamaged during The Blitz in World War II. The Albert was named in tribute to Queen Victoria's husband, Albert, Prince Consort.

== History ==
The Albert was built in 1862 on Victoria Street on the site of an earlier pub called The Blue Coat Boy, which was first recorded in 1831. This earlier pub—named after the famous charity school nearby—was purchased for £978 (equivalent to £102,814 in 2025) by the Artillery Brewery in the mid-nineteenth century. The structure was rebuilt between 1862 and 1867 by Joseph Carter Wood, owner of the Artillery Brewery, and the pub was renamed The Albert, in tribute to Queen Victoria's husband, Albert. On 6 August 1867, the licence was transferred from George Fisher to James Robertson, who later transferred the licence to Joseph Walker on 2 February 1869. In the 1871 census, Walker was listed as the licensed victualler, William Brotherhood as the barman, and Emma Francis as the cook. In the 1881 census, Walter E Wilbourn was listed as the licensed victualler, William Bates as the barman, and Jane Thurlow as the barmaid. By 1891, Thomas Butler was listed as the licensed victualler, his wife Fride W Butler was listed as the manager, John Frankling as the barman, and Louisa J Welland, Miriam Jenkins, and Ellen Howard as barmaids.

The post office directory listing of The Albert included the name John Rumsey in 1899, Thomas Hy Cook in 1915, and Mrs E P Darnell in 1934. During World War II, The Albert survived The Blitz, and the striking façade and Victorian features have remained virtually untouched. The ornate ceilings, hand-etched frosted glass windows, and wrought iron balconies are all original features. The pub displays special memorabilia from its long history, including the House of Commons Division Bell and one of Queen Victoria's napkins. The pub also features the Prime Ministers Gallery, which acknowledges many political figures of the past, some of whom have visited The Albert. The Albert is the only remaining building from the original phase of the development of Victoria Street.

== Description ==
The Albert is a four-storey building constructed of yellow brick with red brick dressings and stucco trim. It is three windows wide facing Victoria Street, and five window deep with a two-storey, three-window extension. The original canted ground floor frontage is central panelled with glazed doors and flanking windows framed by granite pilasters carrying fascia, cornice, and baluster with ball finials. The return features coupled pilasters with small pediments over the cornice than runs across the full extent of the ground floor.

The bar windows and glazed doors have cut, engraved, and frosted glass. The upper floors have recessed sash windows linked by ornate iron balconies on the second and third floors. The slate roof is framed by a stucco molded parapet with a prominent stucco main entablature with deep cornices and lions' head modillions. Centred on both sides are upstands with "The Albert" incised on them. The interior retains some bar fittings that date back to c. 1900.

== Drinks ==
The Albert offers a wide variety of cask ales and beers, including The Albert's own 1730 Special Pale Ale, London Glory, Greene King IPA, Foster's, Stella Artois, Aspall Cider, Guinness, Budweiser, Peroni, Sol, Bitburger, and various craft beers.

== Television location ==
The television series Killing Eve 2018-2022 featured 'The Albert' in Series 1: Episode 2 - ‘I’ll Deal with Him Later.’ (aired April 2018) It features the exterior of The Albert pub in Victoria Street; (whilst the interiors were of the dark-panelled Old Nick in Sandland Street) where characters Bill David Haig, Elena Kirby Howell-Baptiste and Eve Sandra Oh meet Frank Darren Boyd in the pub to ask about the CCTV.
