= Westminster Almshouses Foundation =

Grade II listed building in London, England

Coordinates: 51°29′43″N 0°08′11″W

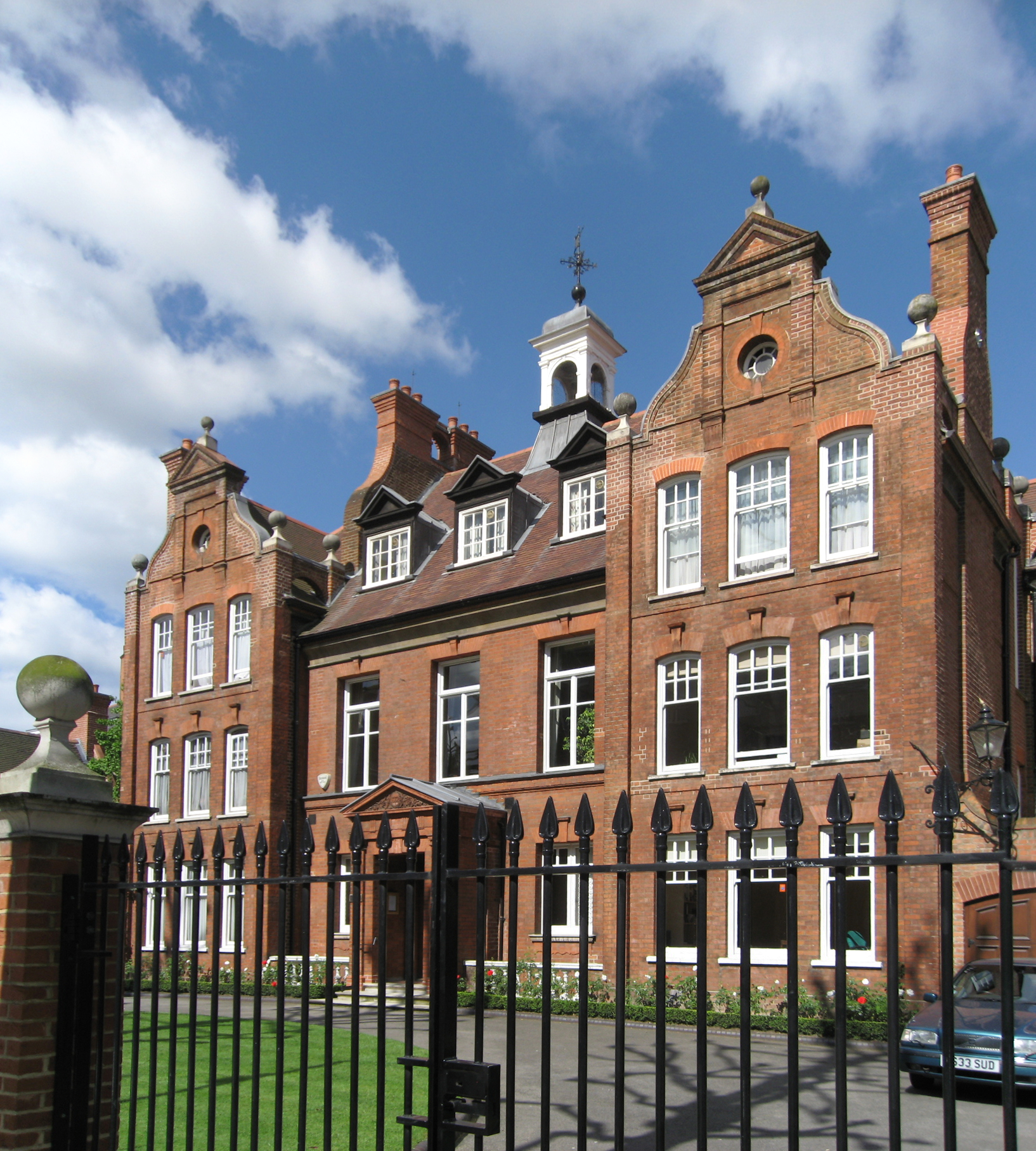
United Westminster Almshouses

The Westminster Almshouses Foundation is based at Palmers House, 42 Rochester Row, London. Its building is a Grade II listed building.

== See also ==
- James Palmer
