= Primrose Day =

Anniversary of the Death of British Prime Minister, Benjamin Disraeli

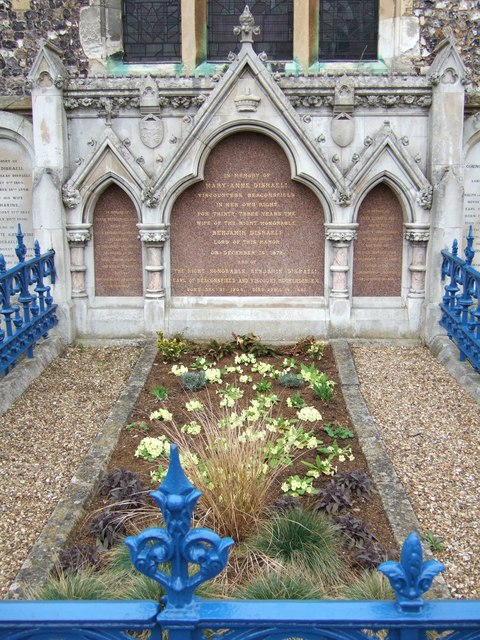
Primroses at Disraeli's tomb at St Michael and All Angels Church, Hughenden

Primrose Day marked the anniversary of the death of the British statesman and prime minister Benjamin Disraeli, 1st Earl of Beaconsfield, on 19 April 1881. The day was marked each year into the 1920s, with arrangements of primroses left at Disraeli's tomb at St Michael and All Angels Church, Hughenden and his statue in Parliament Square and many supporters wearing primroses as buttonholes, garlands, and hat decorations.

== Background ==
Disraeli served as British prime minister in 1868 and from 1874 to 1880. He formed a close relationship with Queen Victoria, particularly after he was widowed in 1872. The primrose was reportedly Disraeli's favourite flower, and the queen would send him bunches of them from Windsor Castle and Osborne House. Disraeli often thanked the queen for her gifts of flowers, picking out the primroses for special praise. The queen unveiled a memorial to Disraeli at St Michael and All Angels Church, Hughenden in 1882.

Contemporary reports noted that Victoria sent a wreath of primroses to Disraeli's funeral with a note "His favourite flowers: from Osborne: a tribute of affectionate regard from Queen Victoria". However, a few years later, a letter from the Queen's Private Secretary, Sir Henry Ponsonby, contradicted that suggestion.

== Commemoration ==
The first celebration of Primrose Day in 1882 was encouraged by the civil servant Sir George Birdwood, who wrote a letter to The Times noting an increase in sales of primroses before the anniversary, and he also proposed primrose decorations at St Stephen's Club. The success of the event in 1883 led to the creation of the Primrose League.

An 1885 painting by the Newlyn School artist Frank Bramley, now held by the Tate Gallery, depicts a young girl who has been gathering primroses on Primrose Day, sitting near an engraved portrait of Disraeli. Another Newlyn artist, Ralph Todd, painted a similar scene, now at Penlee House.

In 1916, Pathé News recorded commemorative events, with a wreath laid at Disraeli's statue outside Westminster Palace. Pathé recorded similar events through the 1920s, including Austen Chamberlain in 1921, Sir William Joynson-Hicks in 1923, and Diana Churchill in 1928.

== Primrose League ==
The Primrose League was formed in 1883 to continue the legacy of Disraeli by spreading and popularising traditional Conservative ideals, including the British monarchy, the British Empire, the Anglican Church, and free enterprise. Promoted by Lord Randolph Churchill, who advocated Tory Democracy, the League grew rapidly, with over half a million members by 1887, a million by 1901 and over 2 million members by 1910, roughly equally women and men. The Primrose League faded with universal suffrage after the First World War when the Conservative Party pursued direct mass party membership, and was formally wound up in 2004.

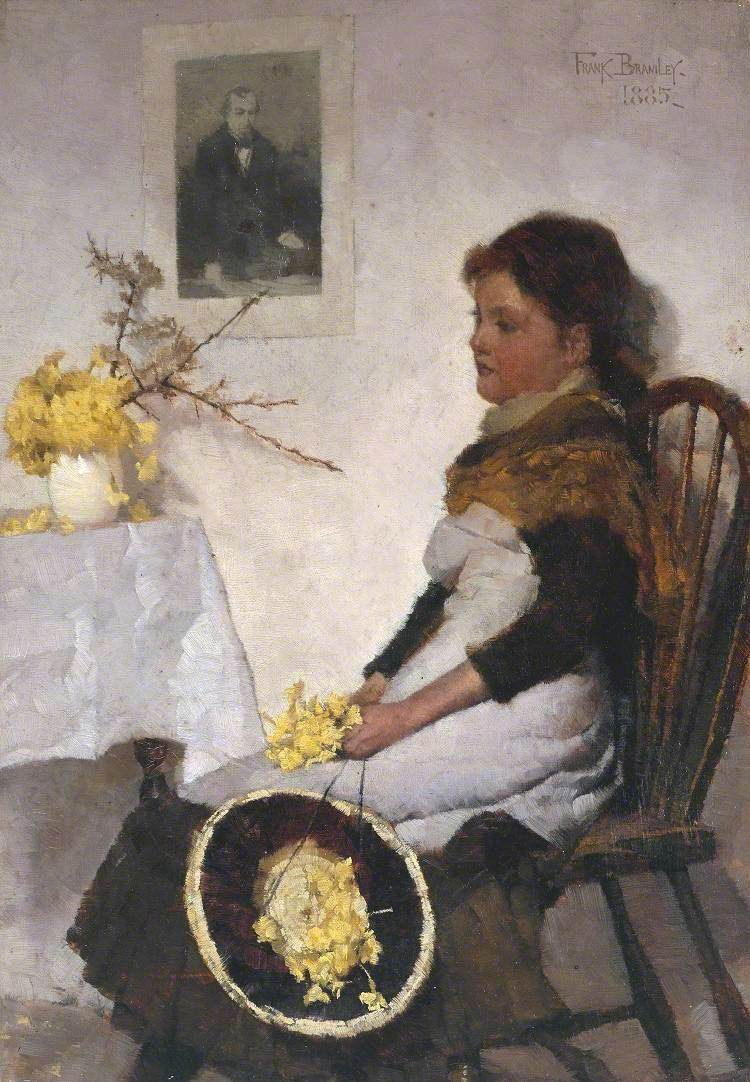
Frank Bramley,1885, Primrose Day, Tate Gallery

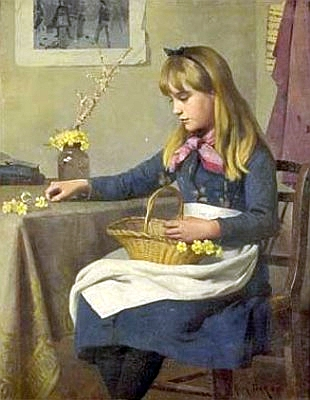
Ralph Todd, 1885, Primrose Day, Penlee House gallery

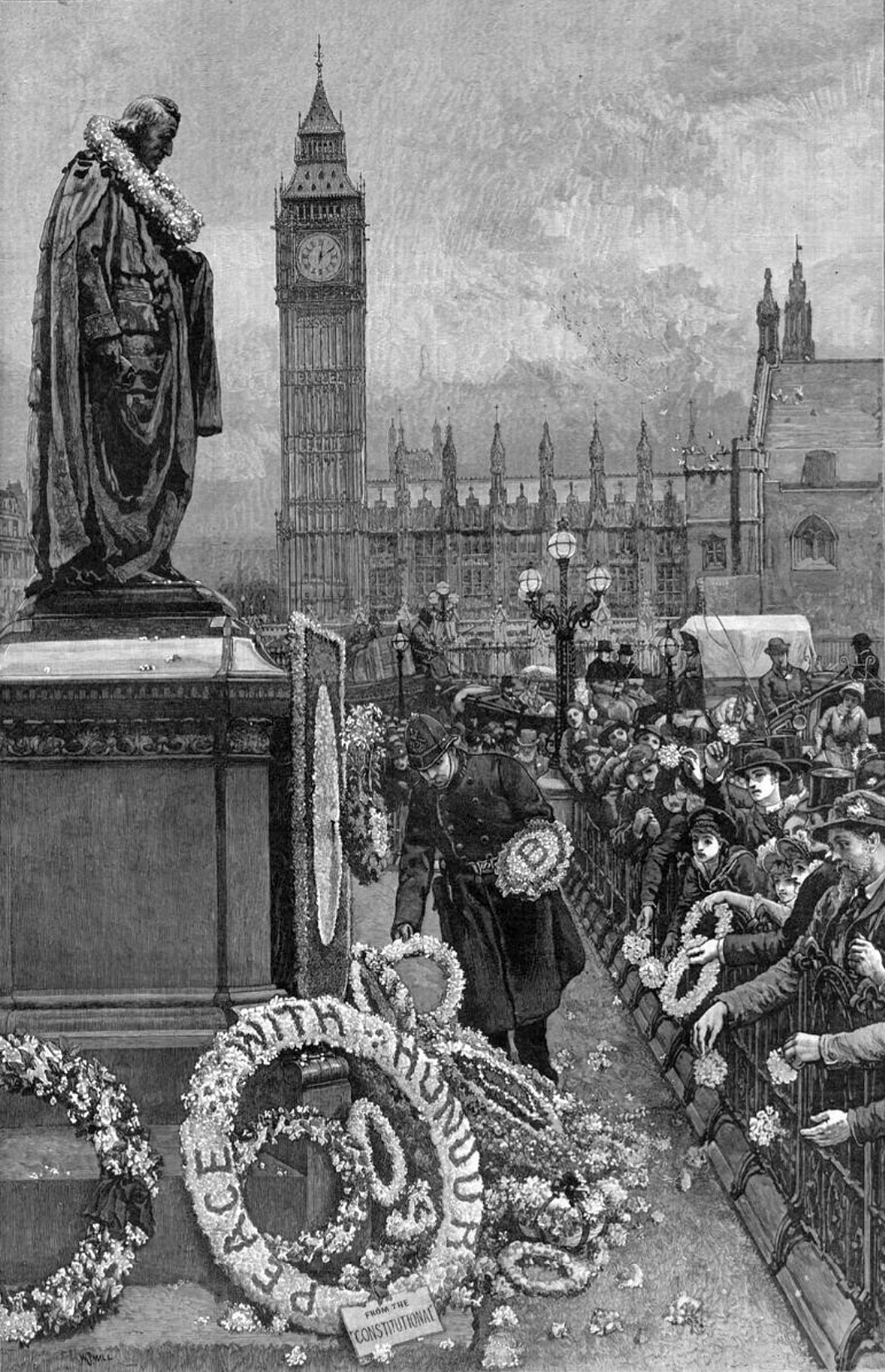
Wood engraving by W. Saull, showing Disraeli's statue in Parliament Square decorated with primroses on Primrose Day, published in Harper's Bazaar, 1886

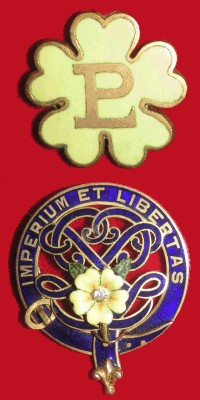
Primrose League badges
