= Statue of David Lloyd George, Parliament Square =

Sculpture by Glynn Williams in London

Statue of David Lloyd George
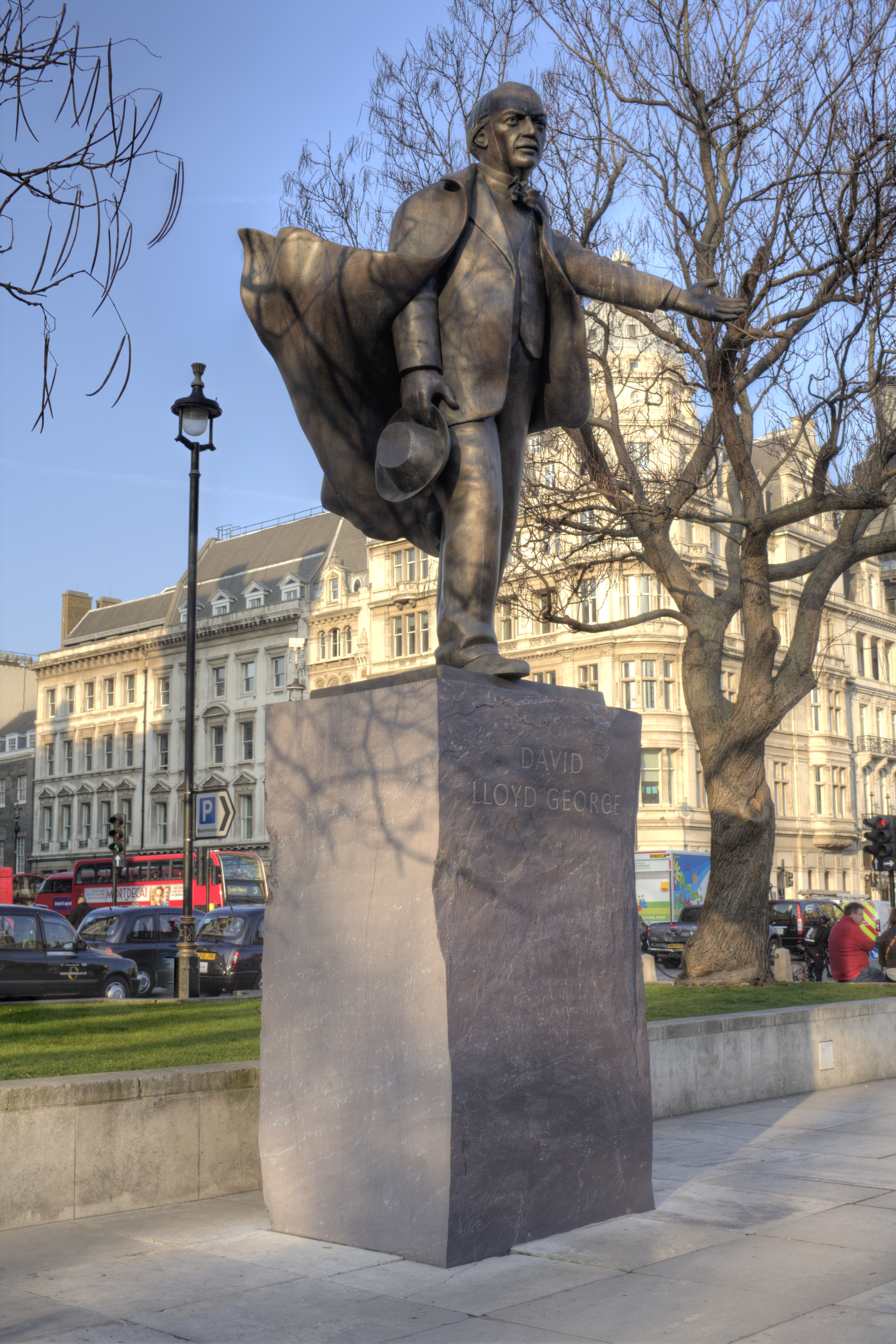
- The statue in 2015
- Artist: Glynn Williams
- Subject: David Lloyd George
- Location: London, United Kingdom; 51.500783°N 0.126700°W

An outdoor bronze sculpture of former British prime minister David Lloyd George by Glynn Williams stands in Parliament Square in London, United Kingdom.

This statue, which stands 8 feet (2.4 m) tall, was unveiled in October 2007 and was funded by the David Lloyd George Statue Appeal, a charitable trust supported in part by the Prince of Wales.
