= Statue of Lord Palmerston, Parliament Square =

Statue by Thomas Woolner in London

Statue of Lord Palmerston
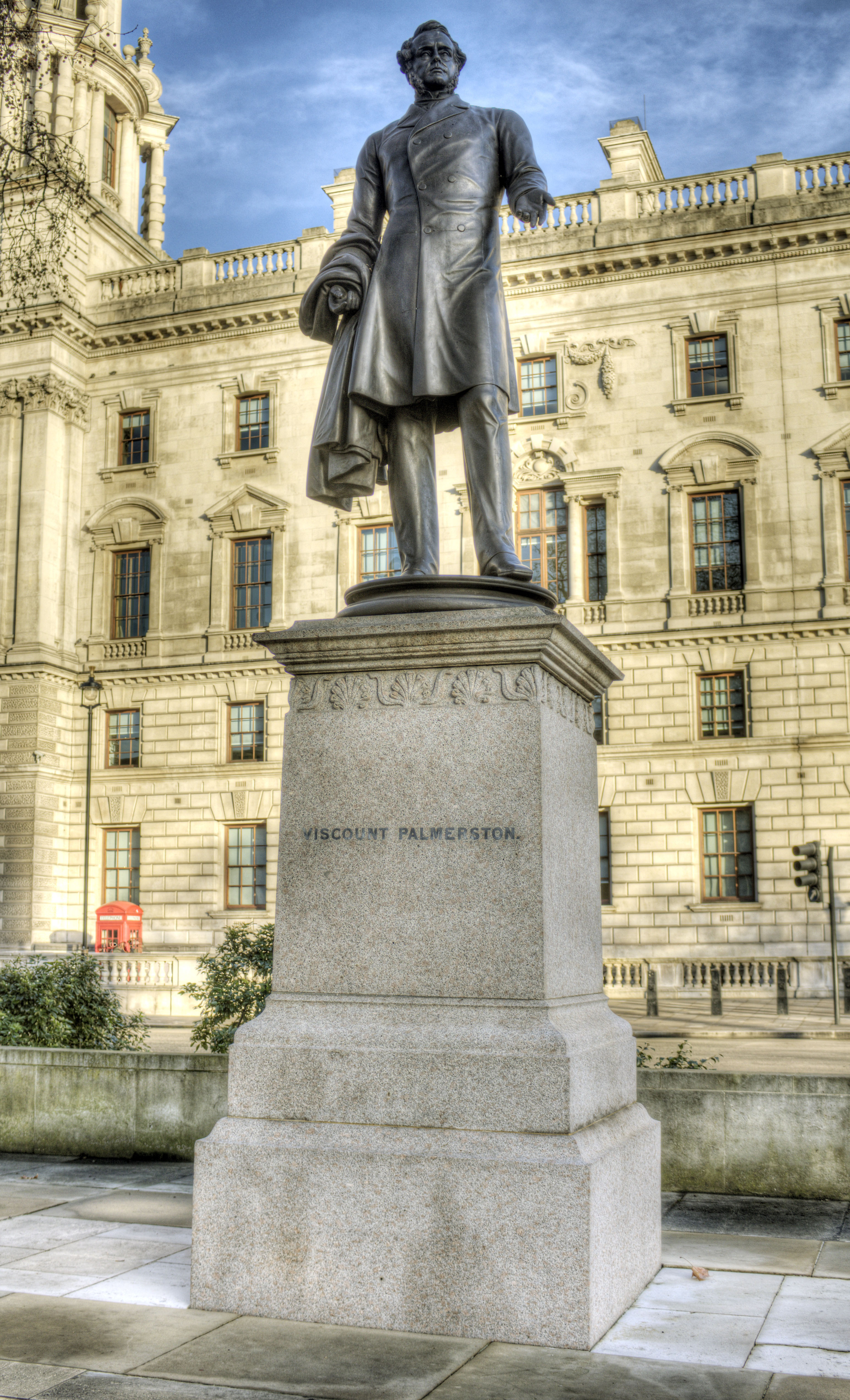
- The sculpture in 2006
- Artist: Thomas Woolner
- Year: 1876
- Medium: Bronze
- Subject: Lord Palmerston
- Designation: Grade II listed
- Location: Parliament Square; London; 51°30′03″N 0°07′38″W

The statue of Lord Palmerston is an outdoor bronze sculpture depicting Henry John Temple, 3rd Viscount Palmerston, located at Parliament Square in London, United Kingdom. The statue, sculpted by Thomas Woolner and unveiled in 1876, stands on a granite pedestal. It is Grade II listed.
