= Glynn Williams =

British sculptor and professor (born 1939)

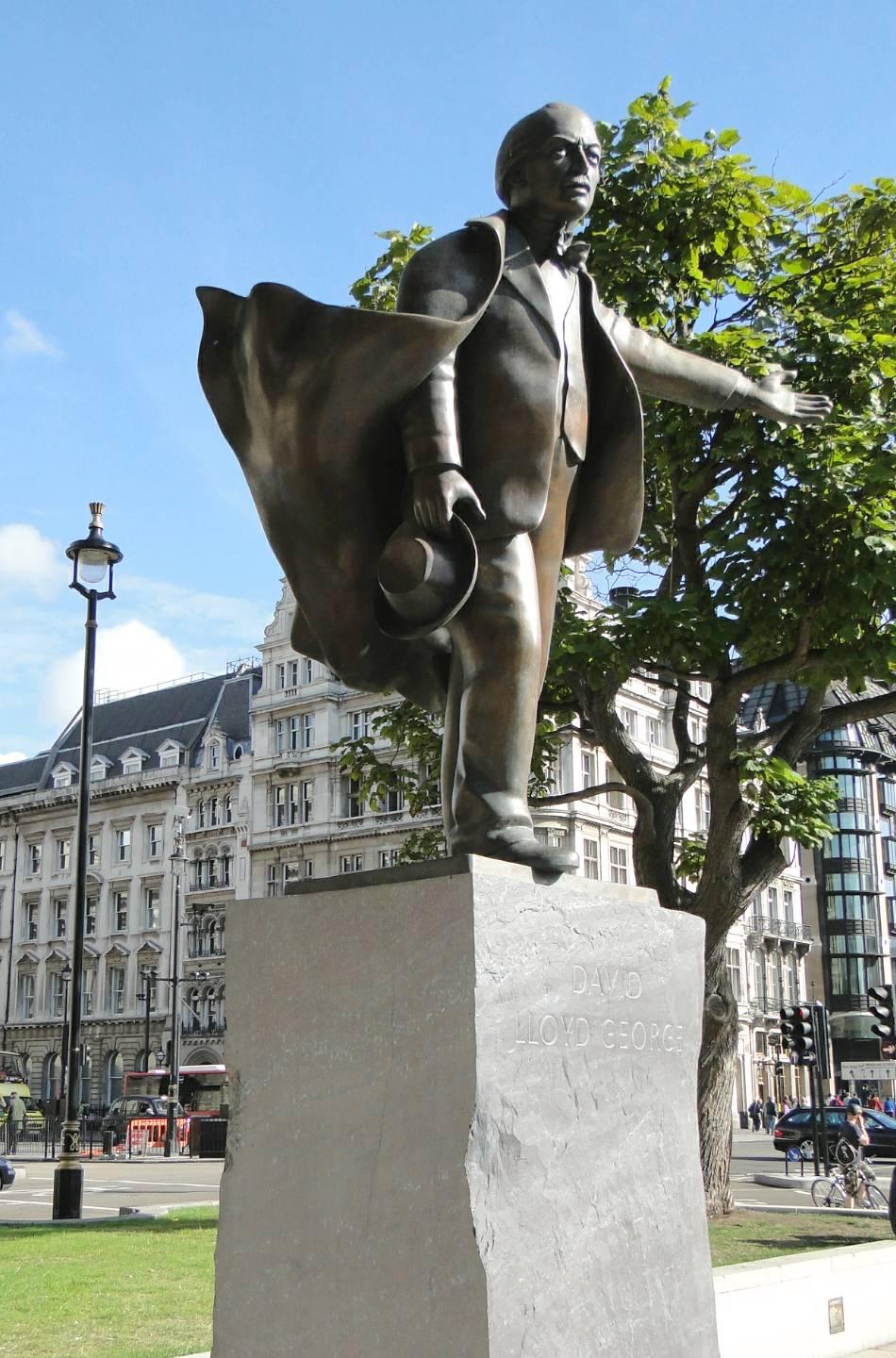
Statue of David Lloyd George, Parliament Square, created by Glynn Williams

Glynn Williams (born on 30 March 1939 in Shrewsbury, England, UK) is a British sculptor. Once an abstract artist, he has worked in the figurative tradition since the late 1970s.

== Life ==
After attending Wolverhampton College of Art in 1955, he worked at the British School in Rome until 1963 after winning the British Prix de Rome scholarship. In 1976, he became Head of the Wimbledon School of Art Sculpture Department, before moving to the Royal College of Art, London, where he became Head of Sculpture in 1990 and Head of the School of Fine Art from 1995 to 2010. He is a Fellow of Royal College of Art, the Royal Society of British Sculptors, and the RSA.

During the 1970s he made abstract sculptures, including crate-like objects in wood, but later in the decade he began carving stone figures.

== Public Sculpture ==
- Lloyd George in Parliament Square, London
- Henry Purcell memorial, Westminster, London
- Portrait of Lord Annan, National Portrait Gallery
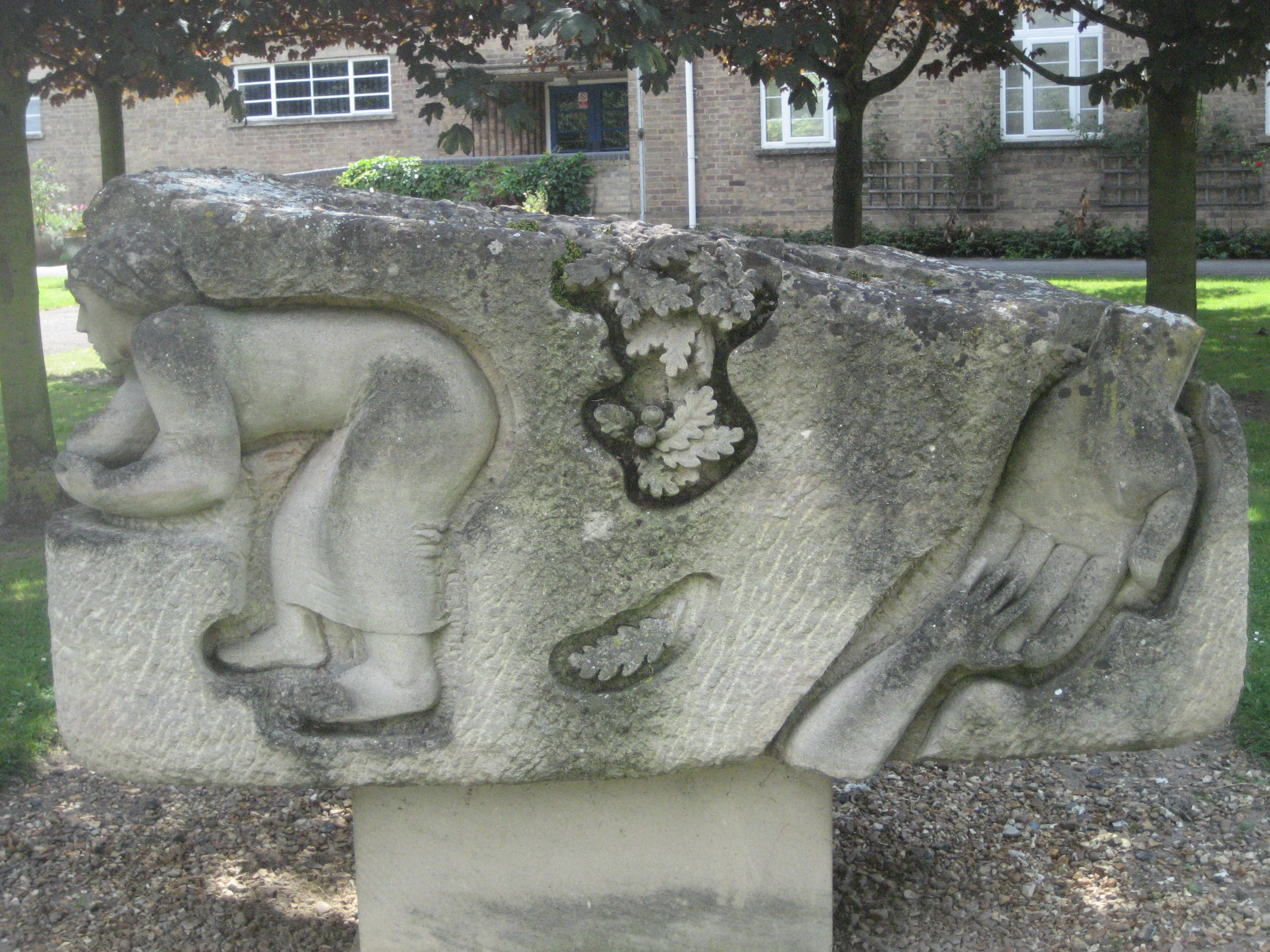
Bottisham Stone

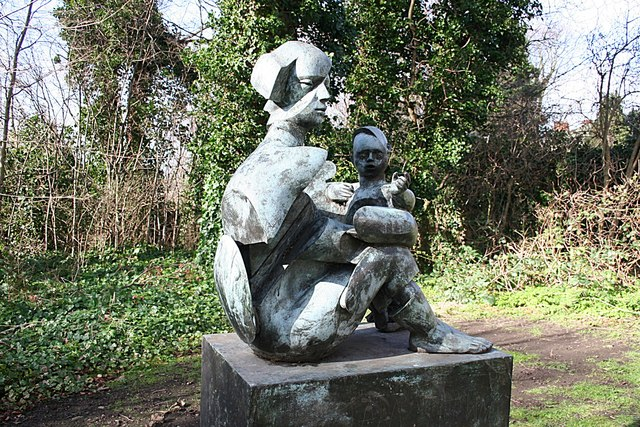
Mother and Child at the Lawn

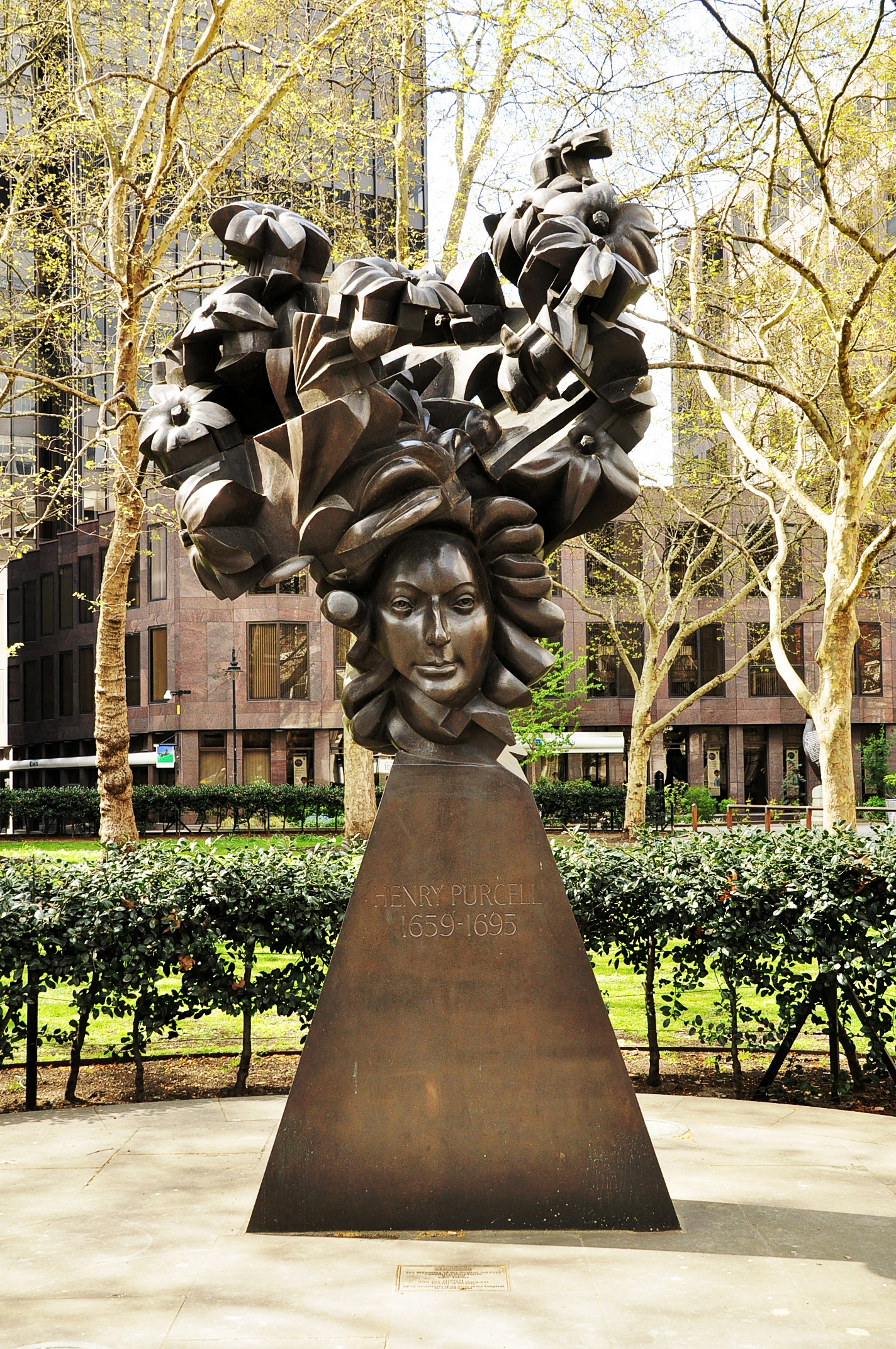
Henry Purcell (London)

== Portraits of Glynn Williams ==
A photographic portrait of Williams by Sue Adler exists in the National Portrait Gallery.

A terracotta head by Jon Edgar was exhibited at Yorkshire Sculpture Park in 2013 as part of the Sculpture Series Heads exhibition.
