= Rochester Row =

Street in the City of Westminster, London

Coordinates: 51.49504°N 0.13609°W

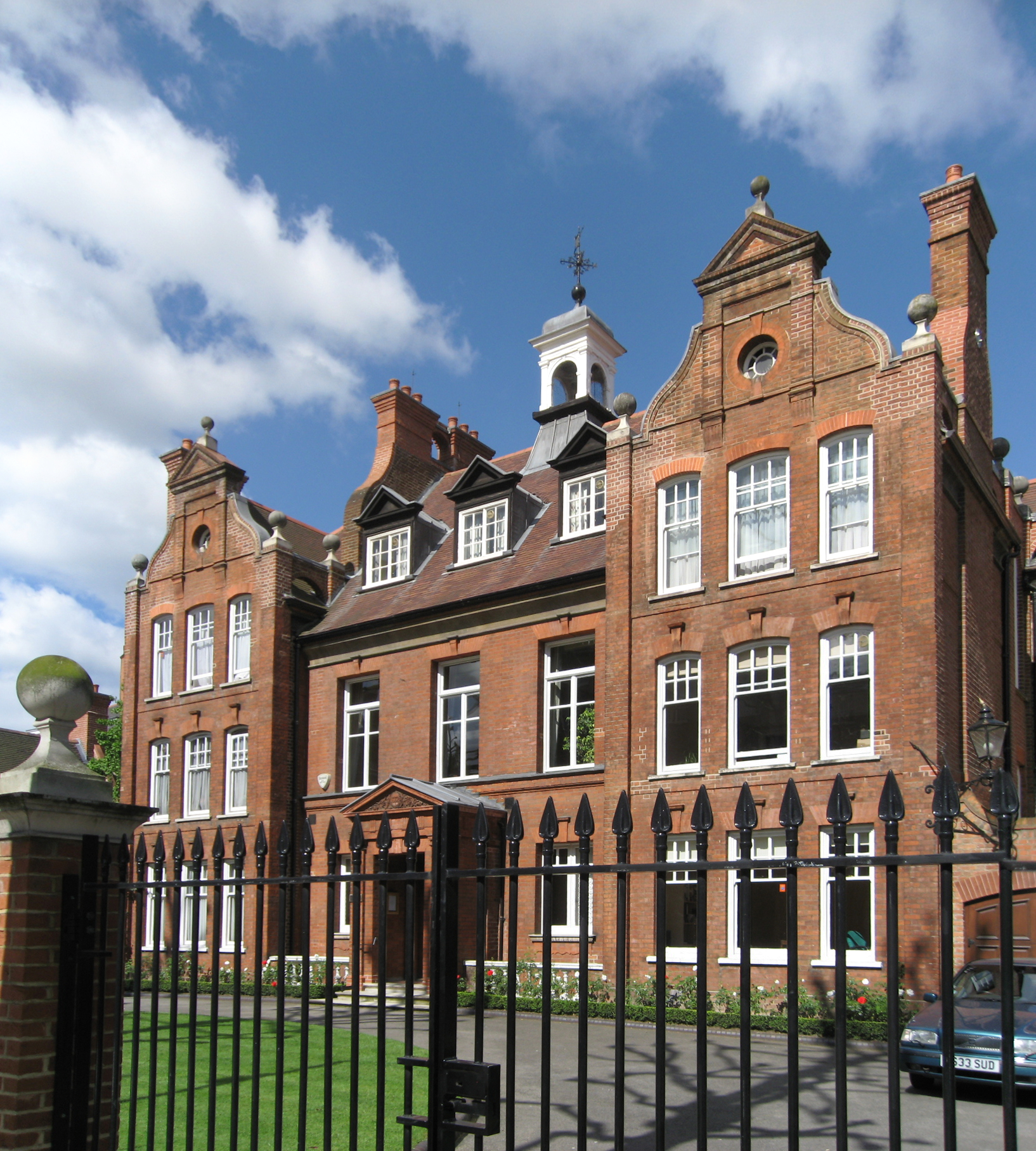
United Westminster Almshouses

Rochester Row is a street in the City of Westminster in London that runs between Greycoat Place in the north and Vauxhall Bridge Road in the south.

It is joined by Greycoat Street, Rochester Street, Vincent Square, Emery Hill Street, Vane Street, Stillington Street, and Willow Place.

On 4 May 1927, the Charing Cross Trunk Murder took place in a third floor office at 86 Rochester Row. On 6 May, John Robinson, a 35-year-old estate agent, took a cab to Charing Cross railway station, where he deposited a large black trunk in the left-luggage office. On 10 May after a "dreadful smell" was noted, the police opened the trunk to find the dismembered body of a woman. Robinson eventually confessed to the murder of prostitute Minnie Bonati, for which he was hanged on 12 August.

It is the location of a number of listed and other notable buildings:

- Pair of K6 telephone kiosks
- St Stephen's Church
- United Westminster Almshouses
- Police station
- Magistrates Court
