= 2023 State Opening of Parliament =

Start of session of UK Parliament

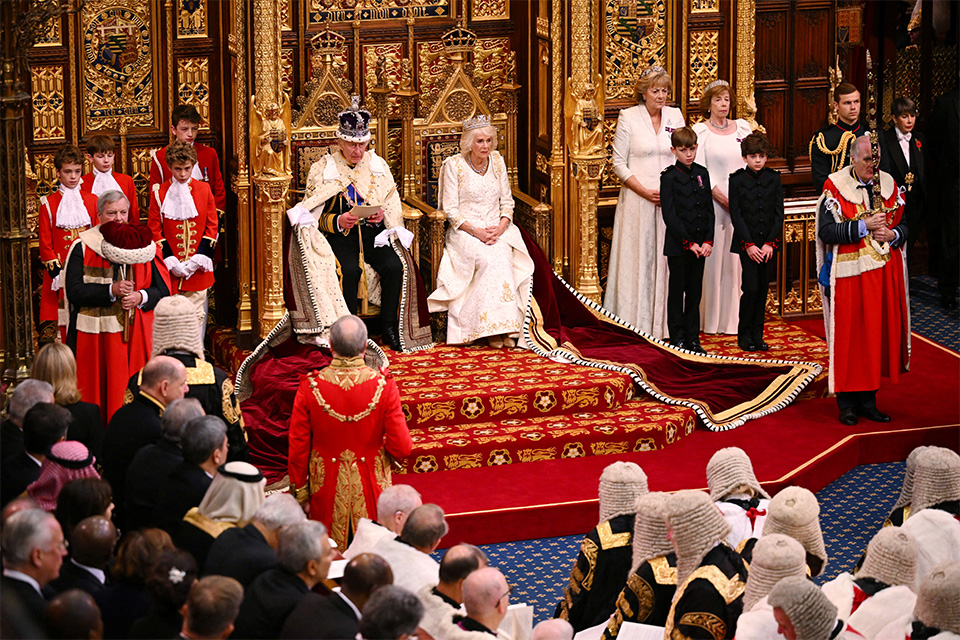
- King Charles III and Queen Camilla sitting in the House of Lords
- Legislative body: Parliament of the United Kingdom
- Meeting place: Palace of Westminster
- Date: 7 November 2023
- Government: Sunak ministry

A State Opening of the Parliament of the United Kingdom took place on 7 November 2023 when King Charles III opened the fourth session of the Parliament elected in 2019, which was the last before the 2024 general election. Charles III delivered the King's Speech, his first as monarch, and set out the UK government's legislative programme for the following parliamentary session.

Along with Queen Camilla, Charles III travelled to Westminster in the Diamond Jubilee State Coach and was accompanied by the Household Cavalry, the first time a full military procession had taken place for the ceremony since before the COVID-19 pandemic. At Westminster, the King read the 1,223 word speech from the throne in the House of Lords, the first time a King's Speech had been presented to Parliament since November 1951. The speech was then debated by both Houses of Parliament. 2023 also marked Rishi Sunak's lone State Opening of Parliament since his election as Conservative party leader and appointment as UK Prime Minister a year earlier.

Keen to showcase Conservative Party policy ahead of a general election and present himself as the "change candidate", Sunak set out an agenda of 21 pieces of legislation, with crime a key focus. Bills included the Sentencing Bill which sought to toughen the rules governing sentencing in England and Wales and a Criminal Justice Bill that would require people convicted of a crime to attend court for sentencing. There was also legislation to introduce a phased ban on smoking in England, to award annual licences for oil and gas projects in the North Sea and to create an independent regulator for English football. The government would also "address inflation and the drivers of low growth". The speech received a generally lukewarm response. While some policies, such as the football regulator and smoking ban, were welcomed, commentators were less enthusiastic. Gordon Rayner of The Telegraph described Sunak as having "served up meagre rations of innovation and large helpings of more of the same", while BBC News's Chris Mason suggested it was "iterative, rather than explosive".

== Background ==
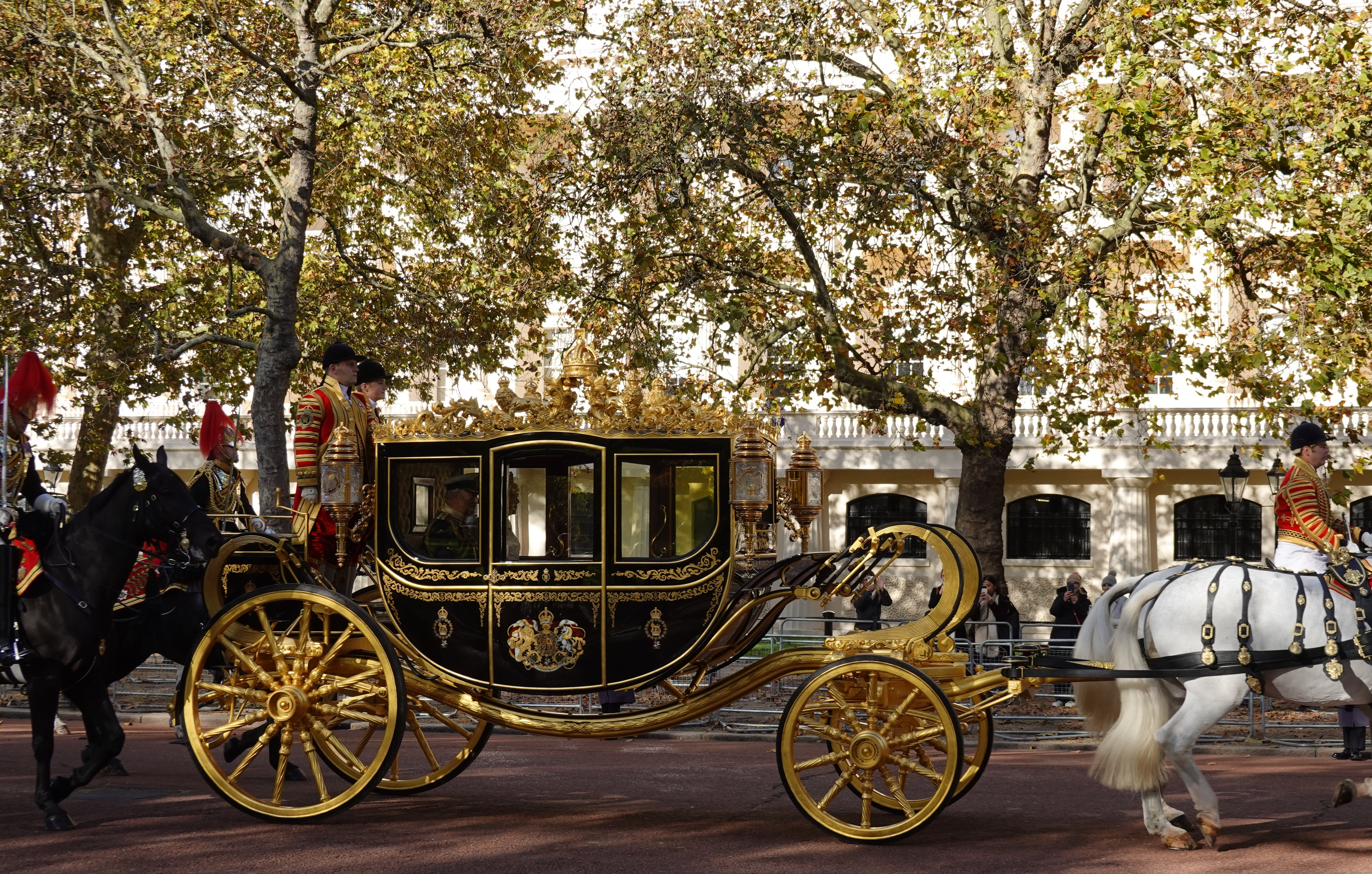
King Charles III and Queen Camilla travelling in the Diamond Jubilee State Coach along The Mall

The State Opening of Parliament marks the first day of a new parliamentary session, and is usually held annually either in May or November. Following the 2022 State Opening of Parliament, which took place in May of that year, the 2022–23 parliamentary session had been expected to run until Spring 2023. However, in December 2022, and after two successive Conservative Party leadership elections, 10 Downing Street announced that the session would be extended until Autumn 2023, allowing extra time for legislation to progress through parliament and making up for parliamentary time lost because of the leadership contests. The 2023 State Opening was widely expected to be the last of the Parliament elected in 2019 as the next general election would need to occur in or before January 2025.

It would be Charles III's first State Opening as monarch, although he had stood in for Elizabeth II to open the previous session after doctors had advised her not to attend, and delivered the speech setting out the government's legislative programme on her behalf. It was also Rishi Sunak's first State Opening since becoming prime minister in October 2022. The governing Conservative Party, which had been in power since 2010, was behind in the polls, and Sunak was hoping the speech would improve the party's standing by showcasing some of its key policies ahead of an election. Sunak was also keen to distance himself from his Conservative predecessors, telling the 2023 Conservative Party Conference he wanted to be the "change candidate".

On 20 July 2023, Penny Mordaunt, the Leader of the House of Commons, confirmed the date of the State Opening of Parliament as 7 November in a statement to the House of Commons. She also confirmed Parliament would be prorogued in the days before the State Opening, with the date of prorogation to be confirmed. On 11 October 2023, the King made an Order in Council providing that Parliament be prorogued no earlier than 26 October 2023 and no later than 31 October. The prorogation took place on 26 October 2023. It was the first time that Parliament was prorogued by a king since 1951.

On 29 October, Rachel Maclean, the Minister of State for Housing and Planning, confirmed the speech would include a bill to phase out some leaseholds in England and Wales. On 4 November, a statement released by 10 Downing Street ahead of the speech said it would "set the country on the right path for the long-term". During the weekend before the speech was scheduled to be delivered, Home Secretary Suella Braverman attracted criticism from homeless charities and some Conservative MPs after a series of posts on X in which she said the government would restrict the use of tents by rough sleepers in England and Wales, but the plans were not included in the legislative programme outlined by the King.

== Ceremony ==
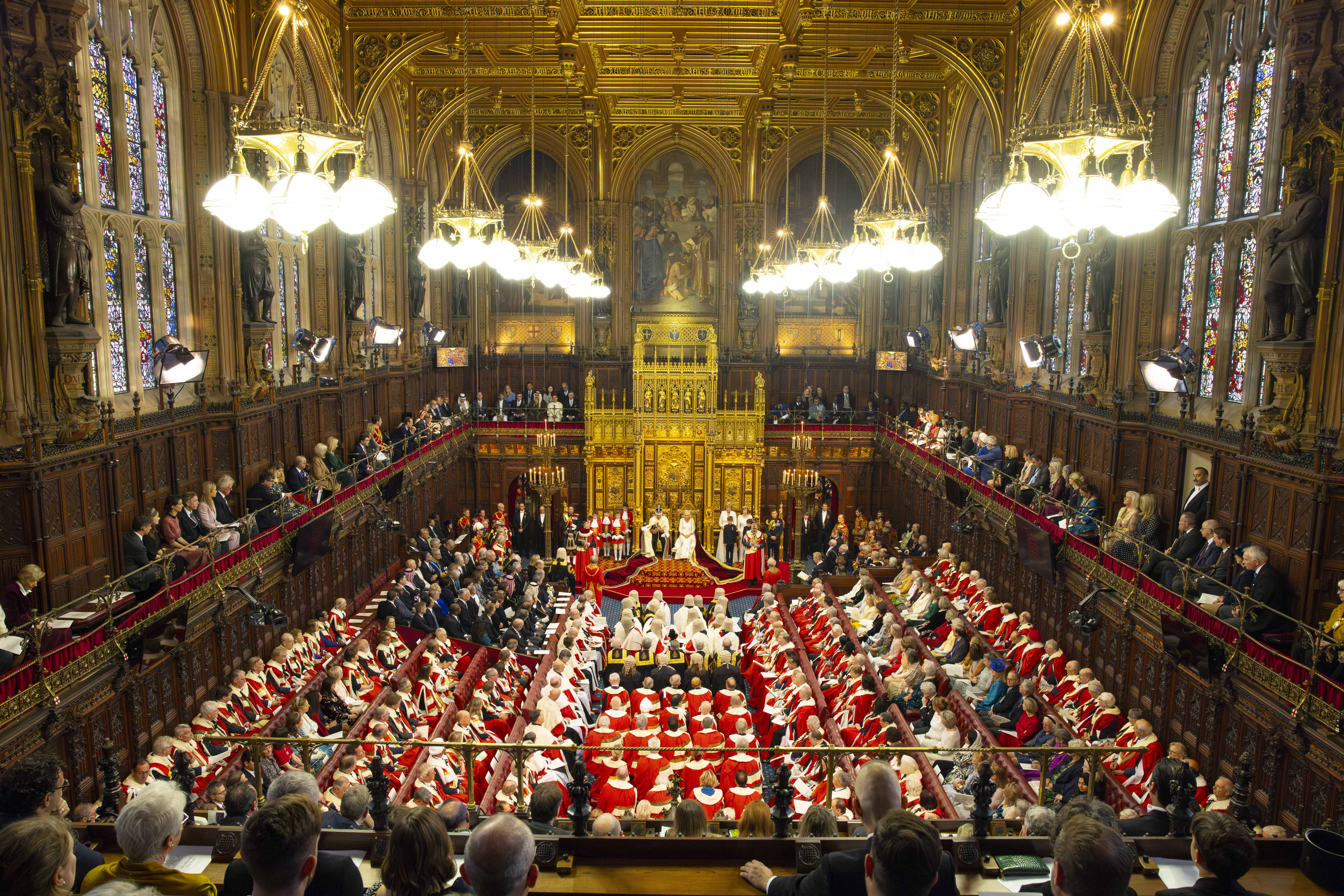
The State Opening of Parliament, November 2023

On the morning of 7 November, Jo Churchill MP, as Vice-Chamberlain of the Household, was "taken hostage" at Buckingham Palace to ensure the King's safe return from Parliament. Charles III and Queen Camilla then travelled from Buckingham Palace to Westminster in the Diamond Jubilee State Coach, escorted by the Household Cavalry. Princess Anne, the Princess Royal travelled in a coach behind the King and Queen in her role as Gold Stick in Waiting, a ceremonial bodyguard role she had also played at the Coronation. The King wore the ceremonial day dress of an Admiral of the Fleet in the Royal Navy with the stars of the orders of the Garter and Thistle, as well as the former's collar, the Royal Victorian Chain and the sash of the Royal Victorian Order. During the speech he wore the Imperial State Crown. The Queen re-wore her coronation gown and wore the George IV State Diadem throughout the event.

The King and Queen entered the Palace of Westminster through the Sovereign's Entrance, reserved exclusively for the monarch, and changed into the Robes of State, before proceeding to the House of Lords, where the King would read the speech from the throne. MPs from the House of Commons were summoned to attend the Lords by Sarah Clarke, who holds the office of Black Rod. As a symbol of the House of Commons' independence from the reigning monarch, the doors to the chamber were closed upon Clarke's approach, requiring her to knock three times for it to be opened. Once MPs had assembled in the Lords, Charles III then read the King's Speech, beginning by reflecting on the life of his mother, the late Queen Elizabeth II, and paying tribute to her "legacy and devotion to service". The speech, prepared by the UK government, set out its planned programme of legislation for the next session of parliament, and was read by the King in a neutral tone so as not to show any appearance of political support. MPs listened to the speech in silence, before returning to the Commons, where a debate on the speech began two hours or so later.

The 2023 State Opening of Parliament was the first time a King's Speech had been presented since November 1951, during the reign of George VI. It was also the first full military State Opening ceremony to occur since before the COVID-19 pandemic, with around 1,400 British Armed Forces personnel taking part. At 1,223 words, the speech delivered by Charles III was the longest monarch's speech at a State Opening of Parliament since 2005, when Elizabeth II had presented a 1,248 word speech.

== Legislative programme ==
The legislative programme announced for the year ahead included some bills that were carried over from the previous session, as well as new legislation. Legislation tackling crime was a key feature of the proposed laws outlined in the speech. Announcements included a Sentencing Bill to implement tougher sentences in England and Wales for the most serious crimes, with those convicted of murder where there is a sadistic or sexual element to the crime receiving a whole life tariff, and a Criminal Justice Bill to require convicted criminals to attend their sentencing hearings, with "reasonable force" being applied to compel them to attend court and an extra two years in prison if they do not attend. Plans were also announced to phase out the sale of cigarettes in England, to regulate pedal-powered taxicabs in London, to issue licences annually for offshore oil and gas projects in the North Sea, and to establish an independent regulatory body for the top five tiers of football in England. In addition, the King said that ministers would "address inflation and the drivers of low growth over demands for greater spending or borrowing" by "the Bank of England to return inflation to target by taking responsible decisions on spending and borrowing". The full list of proposed legislation is as follows:

=== Bills ===
- The Sentencing Bill requiring a whole life sentence for murder where there is a sadistic or sexual element. The bill will also make provisions for shorter prison sentences to be served in the community.
- The Criminal Justice Bill 2023 will require criminals to attend court for sentencing hearings and for "reasonable force" to be used if they refuse to do so. An extra two years in prison can also be added for refusal to attend. Police will also have powers to enter a premises without a warrant to retrieve stolen goods.
- The Victims and Prisoners Bill, which had already been published, will prevent certain prisoners from getting married, and implement Jade's Law, automatically suspending parental rights of a person convicted of the murder or voluntary manslaughter of a person with whom they share parenting responsibilities. The bill will also provide new rights for victims.
- The Investigatory Powers (Amendment) Bill will ensure the UK's intelligence services have the power to tackle evolving threats and advances in technology.
- The Terrorism (Protection of Premises) Bill will be extended to include Martyn's Law, requiring venues to draw up anti-terrorism plans.
- The Leasehold and Freehold Bill will abolish leases for new houses in England and Wales, but will not apply to new flats, while extending the standard lease period from 90 to 990 years.
- The Renters (Reform) Bill will be extended to include a ban on "no faults" evictions, but reform to the courts is required before this can be implemented.
- The Offshore Petroleum Licensing Bill will allow licences to be awarded for North Sea oil and gas projects annually.
- The Animal Welfare (Livestock Exports) Bill will ban the export of cattle from Great Britain for the purposes of fattening and slaughter.
- The Automated Vehicles Bill will make provisions for self-driving vehicles on UK roads, and also exempt passengers from prosecution for anything that goes wrong with a self-driving vehicle.
- The Digital Markets, Competition and Consumers Bill will strengthen the rights of consumers making online purchases, and deal with the problem of fake product reviews.
- The Data Protection and Digital Information Bill will replace existing EU legislation by creating a new framework for data rights in the UK.
- The Media Bill proposes major deregulation of commercial radio and support for radio stations on smart speakers.
- The Tobacco and Vapes Bill will legislate for a proposed phased ban on the smoking of cigarettes in England, expected to start from 2027 and raise the legal smoking age by one year each year. Restrictions will also be introduced on the packaging and marketing of vapes.
- The Football Governance Bill will establish an independent regulator for the top five tiers of English football.
- The Pedicabs (London) Bill will give Transport for London the authority to regulate pedal-powered taxis operating in London.
- The Arbitration Bill will modernise the arbitration process as recommended by the Law Commission for England and Wales.
- The Trade Bill 2023 will set out provisions for the UK to join the CPTPP trade pact with 11 Asian and Pacific nations.
- The Holocaust Memorial Bill will legislate to build a UK Holocaust Memorial in Victoria Tower Gardens.
- The Economic Activity of Public Bodies (Overseas Matters) Bill will prohibit public sector organisations from being able to boycott Israel.
- The Rail Reform Bill will create a new public body to oversee railways in Great Britain, but is only included in draft format.

== Response ==
Sunak described the programme of legislation outlined in the speech as "taking long-term decisions to build a brighter future for our country". But Sir Keir Starmer, the Leader of the Labour Party and Leader of the Opposition, described it as offering only "sticking plasters" and suggested it was "a plan for more of the same". Labour also expressed concerns about the plans for the awarding of annual licences for oil and gas projects in the North Sea, something that already occurred, but which ministers would be legally required to do under the new legislation. Sir Ed Davey, the Leader of the Liberal Democrats, claimed the government was "out of touch and out of ideas", and said the speech failed to address issues such as the cost of living crisis and the National Health Service. Stephen Flynn, the Leader of the Scottish National Party at Westminster, claimed the speech had ignored measures that could increase economic growth, such as more migration.

Writing in The Telegraph, Gordon Rayner suggested Sunak had "served up meagre rations of innovation and large helpings of more of the same", while Rowena Mason, Whitehall editor of The Guardian, suggested the Prime Minister had "not managed to rustle up many big ideas that place him on the side of the electorate in opposition to Labour". Referring to what he described as the "double debut" of the King's first State Opening of Parliament and the Prime Minister's first legislative programme, Tom Gordon of The Glasgow Herald, said "the special occasion did not make for special content". Chris Mason, political editor at BBC News, suggested the speech "felt very Sunakian: iterative, rather than explosive, but with an emphasis on ideas he is personally passionate about, like banning young people from smoking".

The announcement of a new independent football regulator was welcomed by Rick Parry of the English Football League, who described it as a "landmark commitment", while Sports Minister Tracey Crouch, who in 2022 chaired a fan-led review that recommended the body, welcomed the bill's inclusion in the King's Speech as "an important step" for English football. The proposals for a smoking ban were welcomed by nursing leaders, including Professor Nicola Ranger of the Royal College of Nursing, who described it as "positive". The Media Bill was welcomed by members of the broadcasting industry, including Alex Mahon, Chief Executive of Channel 4, who said reforms to the UK media were "long overdue".

The omission of some proposals from the speech attracted criticism. Examples of bills absent from the programme included legislation for a ban on conversion therapy and a ban on the import of hunting trophies into the UK, both of which had previously been floated as possible legislation by the Conservative Party. The Equality and Human Rights Commission said it was "disappointed" that a ban on conversion therapy, first suggested in 2018, was not included, while Robbie de Santos, Director of External Affairs at Stonewall, claimed the government had "given the green light for the abuse against LGBTQ+ people to continue unchecked". But Simon Calvert, deputy director at the Christian Institute, suggested such legislation would "seriously impact free speech, religious freedom, freedom of association, and the rights of parents".

The King and Queen were booed by anti-monarchy protestors from the Republic pressure group, who held up yellow banners declaring "Not My King", as they left Parliament in the Diamond Jubilee State Coach. Republic said the demonstration was held "to protest for democracy and the right to elect our head of state". Scottish National Party MP Kirsty Blackman criticised the ceremony's "pomp" and questioned whether "sapphires and rubies" were the "right image that anybody wants to be seeing".

== Subsequent events ==
Sunak began a cabinet reshuffle on 13 November, during which he dismissed Braverman as Home Secretary following controversy over a Times article criticising the police, and appointed former Conservative Prime Minister David Cameron as Foreign Secretary. ITV News's deputy political editor, Anushka Asthana, suggested Cameron's appointment would make it more difficult for Sunak to argue he was a change candidate.

During a debate on the speech on 15 November, a Scottish National Party proposed amendment calling for the government to call for a ceasefire in the Gaza war was defeated 294–125. Ten members of the Labour frontbench, including eight shadow ministers, left their positions in order to support the amendment, with a total of 56 Labour MPs defying the whip to vote in favour of it.

The Leasehold and Freehold Bill, introduced into Parliament on 27 November, did not include a ban on the sale of new leasehold houses as outlined in the King's Speech, with the UK government saying it would introduce the ban through an amendment later in the bill's process. Labour accused the government of watering down the legislation and failing to match their original commitment. Campaigners, Labour and some Conservative MPs called for the ban to be extended to flats, but Baroness Joanna Penn, a minister in the Department for Levelling Up, Housing and Communities, said the situation for flats was "more complicated".

The Tobacco and Vapes Bill was abandoned after Sunak called the 2024 general election, but was revived by the succeeding Government of Keir Starmer and announced as part of Labour's legislative programme during the 2024 State Opening of Parliament.
