= Buxton Memorial Fountain =

Fountain in London

Coordinates: 51°29′46″N 0°07′29.25″W

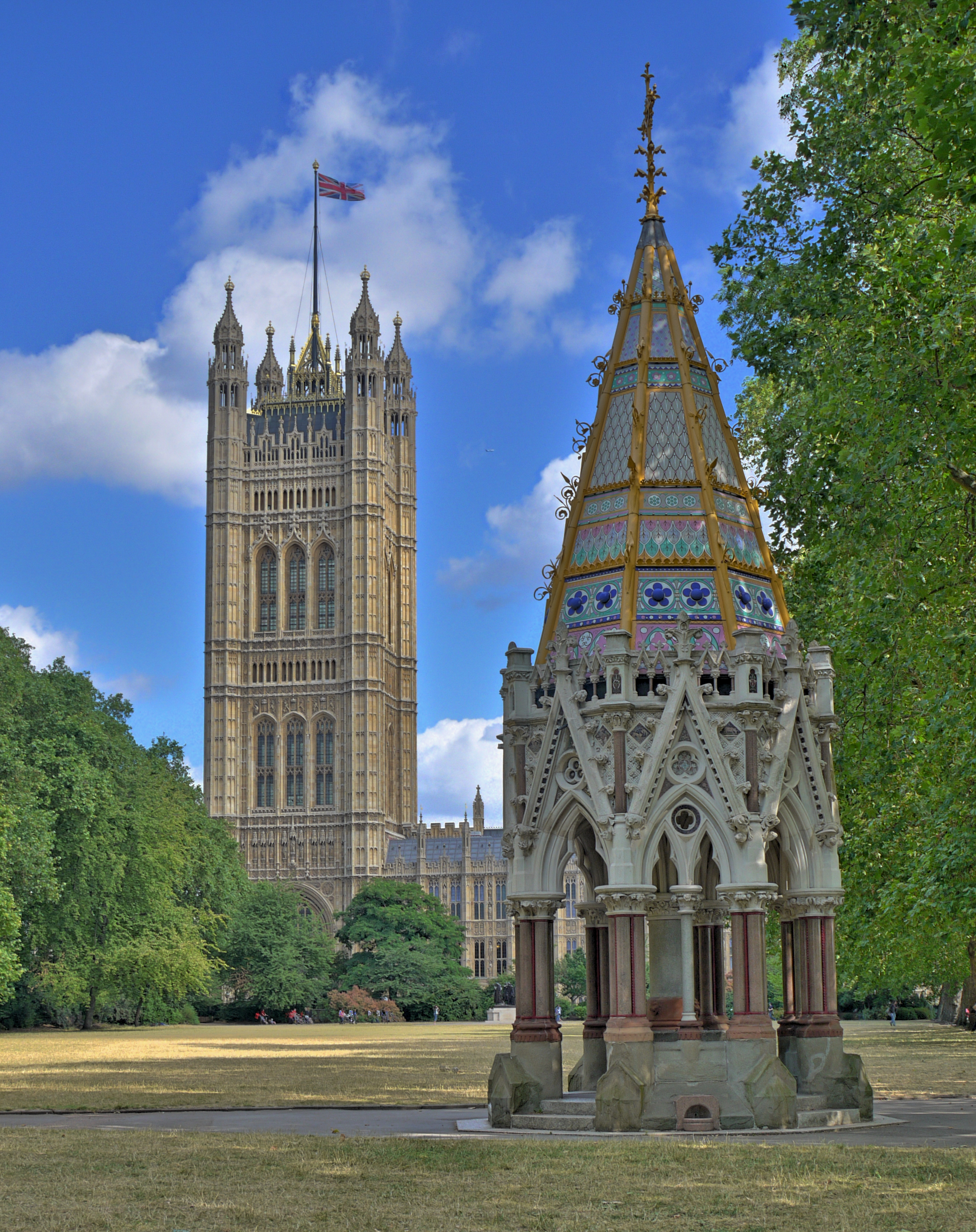
The Buxton Memorial Fountain, designed by Charles Buxton and Samuel Sanders Teulon, celebrating the emancipation of slaves in the British Empire in 1834, in Victoria Tower Gardens, Millbank, Westminster, London.

The Buxton Memorial Fountain is a memorial and drinking fountain in London, the United Kingdom, that commemorates the emancipation of slaves in the British Empire in 1834, and in particular, the role of British parliamentarians in the abolition campaign.

It was commissioned by Charles Buxton MP, and was dedicated to his father Thomas Fowell Buxton along with William Wilberforce, Thomas Clarkson, Thomas Babington Macaulay, Henry Brougham and Stephen Lushington, all of whom were involved in the abolition. It was designed by Charles Buxton, who was himself an amateur architect, in collaboration with the neo-Gothic architect Samuel Sanders Teulon (1812–1873) in 1865. It coincided with the passing of the Thirteenth Amendment to the United States Constitution, which effectively ended slavery in the United States. The memorial was completed in February 1866.

It was originally constructed in Parliament Square, erected at a cost of £1,200. As part of the postwar redesign of the square it was removed in 1949 and not reinstated in its present position in Victoria Tower Gardens until 1957.

There were eight decorative figures of British rulers on it, but four were stolen in 1960 and four in 1971. They were replaced by fibreglass figures in 1980. By 2005 these were missing, and the fountain was no longer working. Between autumn 2006 and February 2007 restoration works were carried out. The restored fountain was unveiled on 27 March 2007 as part of the commemoration of the 200th anniversary of the Abolition of the Slave Trade Act 1807 (47 Geo. 3 Sess. 1. c. 36) to abolish the slave trade.

A memorial plaque commemorating the 150th anniversary of the Anti-Slavery Society was added in 1989.

As of 2026 the future of the memorial fountain is uncertain with the royal assent of the Holocaust Memorial Act 2026 and plans for the UK Holocaust Memorial in the future. In 2024 the Buxton family & Thomas Fowell Buxton Society petitioned against the act in preservation of the memorial.

== Description ==
Audio description of the memorial by David Harewood

The base is octagonal, about twelve feet in diameter, having open arches on the eight sides, supported on clustered shafts of polished Devonshire marble around a large central shaft, with four massive granite basins. Surmounting the pinnacles at the angles of the octagon are eight figures of bronze, representing the different rulers of England; the Britons represented by Caractacus, the Romans by Constantine, the Danes by Canute, the Saxons by Alfred, the Normans by William the Conqueror, and so on, ending with Queen Victoria. The fountain bears an inscription to the effect that it is "intended as a memorial of those members of Parliament who, with Mr. Wilberforce, advocated the abolition of the British slave-trade, achieved in 1807; and of those members of Parliament who, with Sir T. Fowell Buxton, advocated the emancipation of the slaves throughout the British dominions, achieved in 1834. It was designed and built by Mr. Charles Buxton, M.P., in 1865, the year of the final extinction of the slave-trade and of the abolition of slavery in the United States."
