= UK Holocaust Memorial =

Planned memorial in London, England

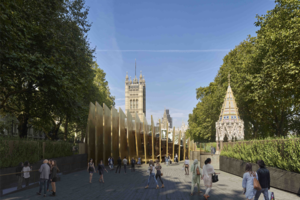
- Proposed Holocaust Memorial, London

- Location within City of Westminster Location within Greater London
- Coordinates: 51.49586°N 0.12481°W

A UK Holocaust Memorial and learning centre was first proposed in 2015 to preserve the testimony of British Holocaust survivors and concentration camp liberators and to honour Jewish and other victims of attempted extermination by Nazi Germany, including Gypsies and disabled people. The existing Hyde Park Holocaust Memorial was opened in 1984.

In 2016 a site in Victoria Tower Gardens, a public park next to the Houses of Parliament in London, was chosen for the memorial. This location caused controversy because of the popularity and nature of the location and the amount of space the memorial would take. In January 2026, the Holocaust Memorial Act 2026 received Royal Assent, removing the legal restriction on building on the park, as well as providing the right to public funding for building and maintenance, and marking a major step in the delivery of the project.

== Background ==
=== Holocaust Commission report ===
In January 2014, UK Prime Minister David Cameron tasked a Holocaust Commission with establishing what more Britain could do to preserve the memory of the Holocaust and ensure that the lessons it teaches are never forgotten. The Commission ran a national call for evidence, to which there were nearly 2,500 responses. This included one of Britain's largest ever gatherings of Holocaust survivors at Wembley Stadium. The Holocaust Commission report was published in 2015. It concluded:

1. there is widespread dissatisfaction with the current national memorial in Hyde Park
2. effective Holocaust education fails to reach significant numbers of young people
3. there is inadequate support for regional projects, compounded by a lack of long-term funding for Holocaust education
4. the testimony of survivors and liberators needs to be urgently recorded and appropriately preserved

and recommended:

1. a striking and prominent new national memorial
2. a world-class learning centre at the heart of a campus, driving a network of national educational activity
3. an endowment fund to secure the long-term future of Holocaust education, including the new learning centre and projects across the country
4. an urgent programme to record and preserve the testimony of British Holocaust survivors and liberators

=== Memorial and Learning Centre ===
The learning centre was to be a visitors' centre and research facility which would teach visitors about the Holocaust and subsequent genocides with the aid of media including historic photographs, film footage and audio recordings.

On 28 January 2021, the then Communities Secretary Robert Jenrick announced that the government would provide free entry, in perpetuity, to all visitors. "Giving universal free access to the memorial puts the UK on the same footing as the most important monuments and museums and will reassure Holocaust survivors their testimony will be freely available to all when they are no longer able to tell the story themselves, forever," Jenrick said. Subject to planning permission, it was expected to open in 2024.

=== UK Holocaust Memorial Foundation ===
The UK Holocaust Memorial Foundation (UKHMF) was formed to oversee the project.

The British government allocated £50 million (later increased to £75 million,) to be supplemented by £25 million from charitable donations, to the UKHMF to support the construction of the memorial. Additional funding was to be sought for the construction of the learning centre.

==== Holocaust Memorial Charitable Trust ====
The Holocaust Memorial Charitable Trust was registered as a charity by the Charity Commission on 30 January 2019 (Registered Charity Number: 1181806). The charity, which has a website, was established to support the building and subsequent operation of the UK Holocaust Memorial and Learning Centre. It was not intended to own or operate the Holocaust Memorial, but to support it and associated activities by way of grant-funding.

== Proposed location ==
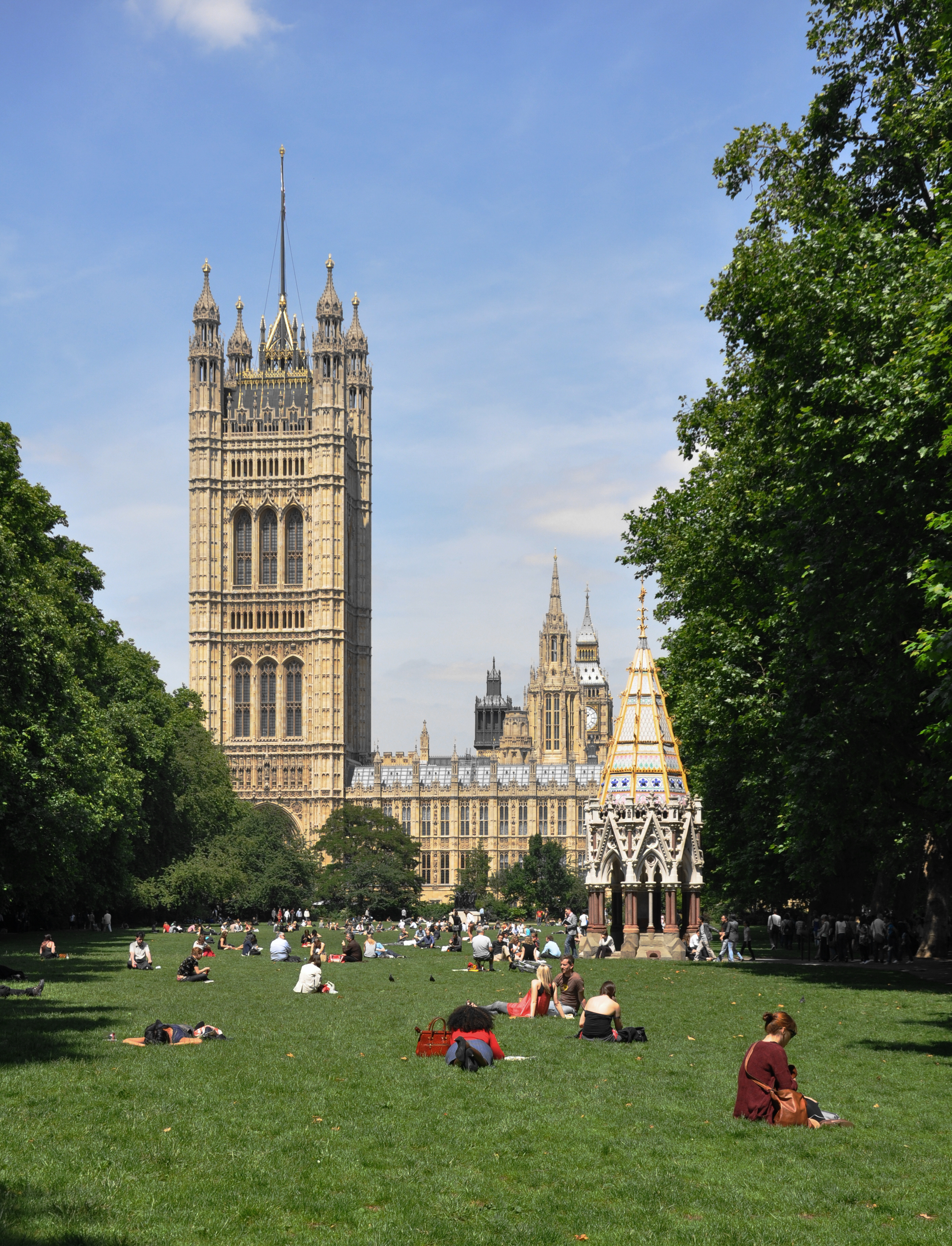
Proposed location in Victoria Tower Gardens

In September 2015, the UKHMF issued specifications for the Memorial and for the education and learning centre. In 2016, the UKHMF undertook a search of over 50 locations and, in July 2016, it was announced that London's Victoria Tower Gardens had been chosen for both the memorial and underground learning centre.

Victoria Tower Gardens is a public park along the north bank of the River Thames in London. It is adjacent to Victoria Tower, the south-western corner of the Palace of Westminster and extends southwards from the Palace to Lambeth Bridge, between Millbank and the river.

Victoria Tower Gardens is a Grade II* listed park created in two stages in 1879-81 and 1913–14. It is in a Conservation Area, is partly within the UNESCO World Heritage Site of Westminster, and is designated a zone of Monument Saturation. The park holds three listed memorials: The Burghers of Calais, the Buxton Memorial Fountain and the Emmeline and Christabel Pankhurst Memorial. It also contains a small children's playground and often holds temporary cultural events (for example, a light installation, spectra, by Japanese artist Ryoji Ikeda, commemorated the centenary of the start of the First World War), and outdoor film screenings. It is cherished by many as a surprisingly peaceful green space in the heart of London.

=== Potential impact ===
The project design team intended the project to be contextualised among these other memorials, but campaigners opposing the Holocaust memorial said it was vastly different in scale and nature from the existing memorials; the memorial would have taken around a quarter of the green space in the park.

The proposed construction was submitted for planning permission to Westminster City Council, who would have to bear in mind their own rules on new monuments in this zone, the effect on heritage views of the Palace of Westminster and the Mayor of London's stated commitment to protect London's green spaces from development. As part of the planning process, Westminster council launched a public consultation regarding the memorial, with critical comments by UK and international organisations publicised in the British press. The official adviser to UNESCO on World Heritage Sites, ICOMOS, objected to the Victoria Tower Gardens location, saying the building would "interrupt substantially the key view of the Tower and Palace". It further said that two lines of trees may not survive the construction, which "would have a massive visual impact."

The Royal Parks, which administers several key parks, strongly supported the principle of the project, but believed its scale and design would have "significant harmful impacts" on the "character and function" of the park. The Environment Agency raised concerns that the building could compromise flood defences crucial to local businesses and homes, saying: "The proposed development is likely to adversely affect the construction and stability of the flood defence [meaning that] surrounding areas will be highly susceptible to rapid inundation." Another aspect that was brought up by tree radar is that apart from roots, there may be a chance of striking unexploded munitions from World War II during the construction process, adding complexity to creating a memorial on this site.

Lord Carlile, the former independent reviewer of terror laws, described the siting of the memorial on the same broad site as the Houses of Parliament as a "self-evident terrorism risk".

A grassroots campaign of local residents, "Save Victoria Tower Gardens", helped raise public awareness about the memorial's proposed site. It launched a petition attracting over 10,000 signatures and wrote letters to editors of national newspapers. Meanwhile, the UKHMF was also active in the press and in submitting consultation responses to the local council website. Over 90% of responses to the consultation opposed the proposed development.

The government was criticised for influencing the results of the consultation by engaging a private company, Big Ideas, to communicate the planned design to the public and solicit responses to the consultation. The company focused on contacting members of Jewish community groups, obtaining a large number of responses, all in favour of the plan in a generic manner with similar text, which the company then submitted to Westminster Council's consultation portal. An answer to a Parliamentary Question from 8 October 2019 showed that around £140,000 was spent by the government on private campaigning companies, in addition to its ongoing funding of the UKHMF. In November 2019, proponents of a memorial to the Transatlantic Slave Trade complained that ample public funding had been provided to the UKHMF, "but not to us".

== Design and planning process ==
An international competition was held for the design of the UK Holocaust Centre. In October 2017, it was announced that the competition was won by a team led by the British-Ghanaian architect David Adjaye (through Adjaye Associates), with Ron Arad Architects as Memorial Architect, and Gustafson Porter + Bowman as landscape architect. The design combines a memorial sculpture with an underground learning centre that will help to educate visitors about prejudice and discrimination. The Memorial consists of 23 bronze fins, with the gaps between the fins representing the 22 countries where the Holocaust destroyed Jewish communities, and acting as separate paths down to a hall named the 'Threshold' leading into the Learning Centre, along with a "contemplation court" and "hall of testimonies". A public consultation on the latest designs was held on 4–8 September 2018. Opponents to the construction of the memorial claim the design is linked to the Adjaye Associates' rejected Ottawa Holocaust Memorial application.

The lead architect of the project, David Adjaye, sparked rebuke from opponents by arguing that "disrupting" the pleasure of being in a park is key to its thinking. David Aaronovitch of The Times and The Observer's architecture critic Rowan Moore discussed arguments against the park. The ensuing flurry of media attention brought to light some of the critical consultation submissions, such as that from Historic England. Furthermore, co-signed letters from politicians for and against the park have been published in the press. Notably, a group of Jewish members of the House of Lords co-signed a letter stating that the memorial 'evokes neither Holocaust nor Jewish history'. In January 2019, 174 politicians co-signed a statement supporting the scheme. Sadiq Khan, Mayor of London, voiced concern about growing opposition.

=== Redesign and response ===
On 29 April 2019, following a consultation exercise, Westminster City Council announced a revised design had been submitted in response to criticisms of the location and design by local residents, the media and bodies including The Royal Parks and Historic England. Barbara Weiss of the Save Victoria Tower Gardens campaign blamed the cost, delay and disruption of a redesign on an initial lack of consultation. The new plans increased loss of green space due to a wider memorial courtyard to accommodate planting.

The resubmitted design was covered in specialist architecture and building press. Royal Parks said: "From the evidence available it is not clear that the revised designs will significantly reduce the impact that the proposed structure will have on this much-loved public amenity space, in an area of central London with few public parks, which is significant." The designs were submitted under the existing planning application. The consultation continued thereafter. Published documents also indicated that the redesign would not meet Environment Agency concerns about provisions to reduce flood risk during building and thereafter.

A letter exchange between Westminster City Council and the UKHMF in August 2019 showed that the memorial "was heading towards an unfavourable recommendation" by planners. The UKHMF claimed that "officers presented as giving excessive weight to the number of objections lodged on the planning portal". The council disputed their "irresponsible and frankly offensive assertions" about the operation of the council's planning service.

=== "Calling in" of planning decision ===
Following a request by UKHMF co-chairs Lord Pickles and Ed Balls, the Communities Secretary Robert Jenrick and Esther McVey, the then Minister for State for Housing, "called in" the application on 6 November 2019. A spokesman said, "A public inquiry will be held and overseen by an independent planning inspector. The Minister will make the final decision on the application taking into account the inspector's recommendation."

A spokesman for Westminster City Council subsequently said: "We've been clear to date that we would consider the scheme on its merits and in line with our planning policy." In February 2020, Westminster City Council's planning committee voted unanimously to reject the planning application, saying it contravened planning rules on size, design and location.

==== Public inquiry (2020) ====
The inspector David Morgan chaired the inquiry from 6 October to 13 November 2020. Due to ongoing COVID-19 restrictions, the inquiry was held as a virtual event; main parties and participants were invited to join via Microsoft Teams or telephone, with documents available online. The inspector's report was submitted to the Secretary of State in early 2021.

On 29 July 2021, it was announced that the Ministry of Housing, Communities and Local Government had ruled in favour of the memorial going ahead. Communities Secretary Robert Jenrick told the BBC News Channel the memorial and learning centre would "educate and inform future generations about the horrors of the Holocaust" and that he hoped millions of people would visit it every year. The Save Victoria Tower Gardens campaign group said it intended to appeal against the ministry's decision.

=== Planning Statutory Review ===
The London Historic Parks and Gardens Trust applied for a Planning Statutory Review (the right to appeal the decision to build the centre in Victoria Tower Gardens). In November 2021, Mrs Justice Lieven of the High Court Queen's Bench Division Planning Court granted them permission. The appeal was granted on two grounds, firstly on a technicality regarding procedure and secondly, because "Although the Inspector did consider the [Imperial War Museum] as an alternative location, the way that he has done so effectively places the burden on the objector to produce a 'detailed scheme', which would in practice be almost impossible to discharge."

=== Overturning of planning permission ===
In April 2022, the High Court found for the London Historic Parks and Gardens Trust and quashed the planning permission. Giving judgement, Mrs Justice Thornton said that those involved in the court case all "support the principle of a compelling memorial to the victims of the Holocaust and all those persecuted by the Nazis during those years when 'humanity was tipped into the abyss of evil and depravity'". The plans did not comply with the London County Council (Improvements) Act 1900, specifically relating to Victoria Tower Gardens, the requirements of which represented "a prohibition on using Victoria Tower Gardens as anything other than a garden open to the public". The Department for Levelling Up, Housing and Communities said it would consider the next steps, adding: "The government remains committed to the creation of a new national memorial commemorating the victims of the Holocaust and it is disappointing – especially for Holocaust survivors – that this judgment will delay its completion."

In July 2022, the project was dealt a further blow when the Court of Appeal refused permission for an appeal against the High Court decision. The public inquiry into the scheme – and the planning report produced for it – was ruled invalid as the planning inspector had not properly considered the London County Council (Improvements) Act 1900, which banned construction in Victoria Tower Gardens. This law would need to be repealed for the monument to be built. As of July 2022, the project, originally estimated to cost £50 million, was expected to cost £103 million.

==== Holocaust Memorial Act 2026 ====
The Holocaust Memorial Act 2026 provided statutory authority for public expenditure on the construction, operation and maintenance of the Holocaust Memorial and Learning Centre, and removed statutory restrictions on development at the Victoria Tower Gardens site. The Act received Royal Assent on 22 January 2026 and came into force on 22 March 2026.

== Other UK Holocaust memorial sites ==
A Hyde Park Holocaust Memorial was opened in Hyde Park in 1983.

The Heritage Lottery Fund in 2018 and 2019 provided significant funding to open a Holocaust Education and Learning Centre in Huddersfield and to refresh and expand the Beth Shalom Holocaust Centre in Nottinghamshire.

In August 2019, the Imperial War Museum announced plans to spend over £30m on a new set of galleries over two floors at its London site covering the Holocaust and its importance in World War II. The galleries opened in 2021, replacing an existing permanent Holocaust exhibition.

== See also ==
- The Wiener Library for the Study of the Holocaust and Genocide (London)
- List of Holocaust memorials and museums
