= Hyde Park Holocaust Memorial =

Holocaust memorial in London, England

- Holocaust Memorial
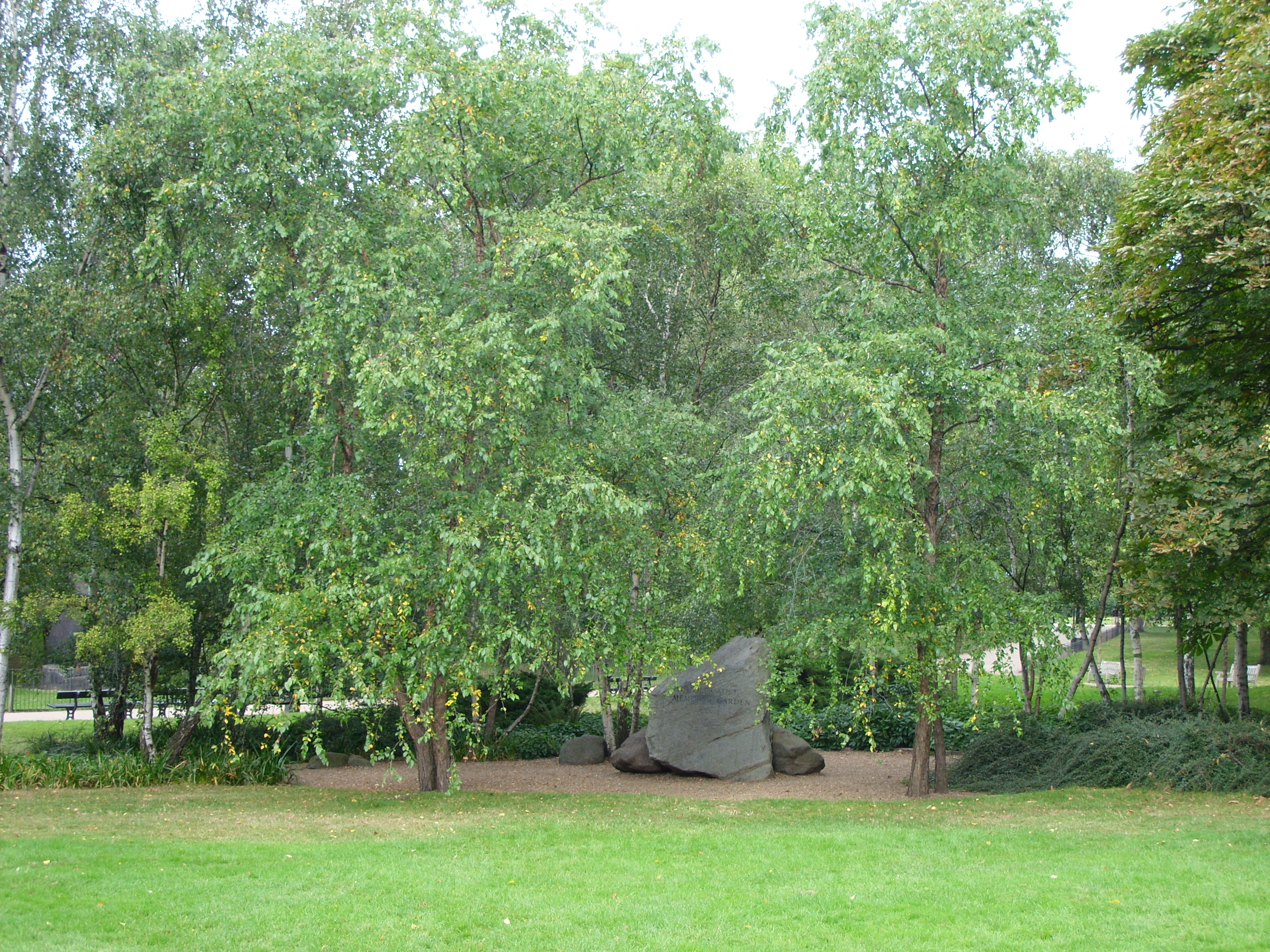
- The Hyde Park Holocaust Memorial
- Interactive map of Hyde Park Holocaust Memorial
- Location: Hyde Park; London, SW1
- Coordinates: 51°30′15.53″N 0°9′32.03″W
- Designer: Mark Badger, Richard Seifert, Derek Lovejoy and partners
- Type: Memorial
- Material: Granite boulder
- Beginning date: 1983
- Completion date: 1983
- Opening date: 1983
- Dedicated to: Victims of the Holocaust

The Holocaust Memorial in Hyde Park, London, was the first public memorial in Great Britain dedicated to victims of the Holocaust. It lies to the east of the Serpentine Lake, in the Dell, an open-air area within the park. Since its unveiling in 1983 remembrance services have taken place at the memorial every year.

== Construction and unveiling ==
The memorial was built in 1983, funded by the Board of Deputies of British Jews under the impetus of then-President Greville Janner, a Labour Party MP. It was designed by Mark Badger, Richard Seifert, Derek Lovejoy and Partners. It was unveiled on 28 June 1983, during a service led by the Environment Secretary Patrick Jenkin. Attended by a crowd of 500 spectators including Sir Immanuel Jakobovits, Chief Rabbi of the United Hebrew Congregations of the Commonwealth, Jenkin described the memorial as "a reminder of the past and a warning for the future". The attending guests then sang hymns and "Adon Olam", a Sabbath hymn.

The then-shadow Environment Secretary Gerald Kaufman, whose grandmother was murdered by the Nazis in Poland, also stated that "the memorial was essential because the German responsibility was partly shared by other countries."

== Design ==
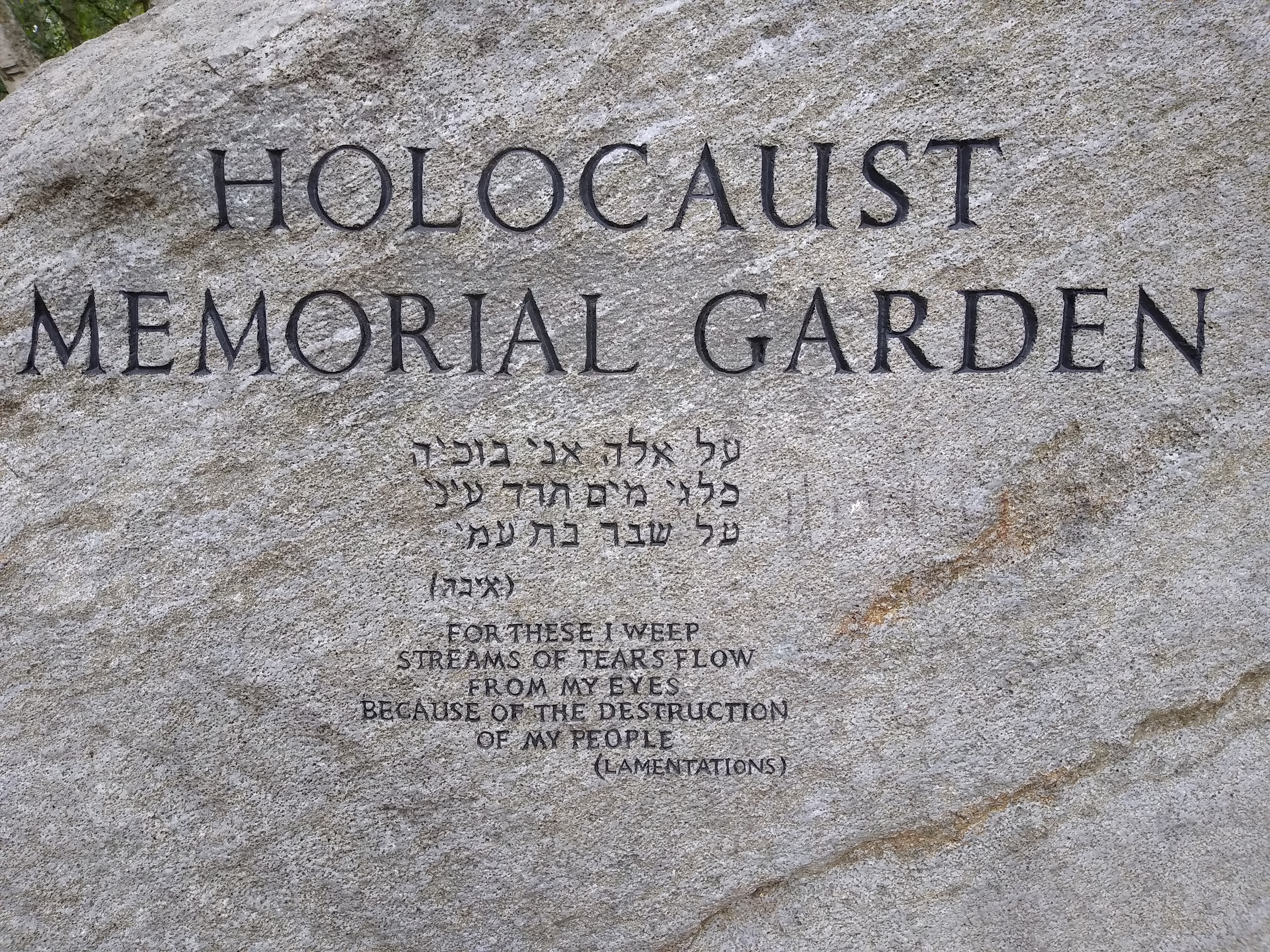
The inscription on the face of the memorial, quoting the Book of Lamentations in Hebrew and English.

The memorial consists of two boulders lying within a gravel bed, surrounded by a copse of silver birch trees. It is inscribed in both English and Hebrew with the words "For these I weep. Streams of tears flow from my eyes because of the destruction of my people", which is a quotation from the Book of Lamentations.

== Controversy ==
In April 2024, the Daily Mail mistakenly reported that London police had covered the memorial out of fear that pro-Palestinian activists might vandalise it. Pro-Israelis viewed this as a victory for antisemites, and described the action as "shameful". A spokesperson from the Royal Parks said: "The Hyde Park holocaust memorial is routinely covered with tarpaulin during various events as a precautionary measure."

== See also ==
- List of Holocaust memorials and museums
- Proposed UK Holocaust Memorial in Victoria Tower Gardens, Westminster
- The Imperial War Museum Holocaust Exhibition in London
- The Wiener Library for the Study of the Holocaust and Genocide (London)
