= List of acts of the 3rd session of the 58th Parliament of the United Kingdom =

This is a list of acts of the 3rd session of the 58th Parliament of the United Kingdom, which ran from 10 May 2022 until 26 October 2023.

Acts passed since 1963 are cited by calendar year, as opposed to the convention used for earlier acts of citing the regnal year(s) in which the relevant parliamentary session was held. Each act passed in a respective year is given a chapter number (abbreviated "c."), denoted by Arabic numerals in the case of public general acts, lowercase Roman numerals in the case of local acts, or italicised Arabic numerals in the case of personal acts. These run as separate series.

67 acts of Parliament were passed by the 58th Parliament in its 3rd session; all were public general acts.

indicates that an act is available to view at legislation.gov.uk, and indicates the location of the original act in the Parliamentary Archives.

== Public general acts ==
{{legislationuk|act |- | {{|Social Security (Additional Payments) Act 2022|public|38|28-06-2022|maintained=y|archived=n|An Act to make provision about additional payments to recipients of means-tested benefits, tax credits and disability benefits.}} |- | {{|Supply and Appropriation (Main Estimates) Act 2022|public|39|14-07-2022|maintained=y|archived=n|An Act to authorise the use of resources for the year ending with 31 March 2023; to authorise both the issue of sums out of the Consolidated Fund and the application of income for that year; and to appropriate the supply authorised for that year by this Act and by the Supply and Appropriation (Anticipation and Adjustments) Act 2022.}} |- | {{|Energy (Oil and Gas) Profits Levy Act 2022|public|40|14-07-2022|maintained=y|archived=n|An Act to make provision for, and in connection with, imposing a charge on ring fence profits of companies.}} |- | {{|Supply and Appropriation (Adjustments) Act 2022|public|41|25-10-2022|maintained=y|archived=n|An Act to authorise the use of resources for the year ending with 31 March 2023; to authorise the issue of sums out of the Consolidated Fund for that year; and to appropriate the supply authorised by this Act for that year.}} |- | {{|Social Security (Special Rules for End of Life) Act 2022|public|42|25-10-2022|maintained=y|archived=n|An Act to provide for certain social security rules which apply where life expectancy is 6 months or less to apply instead where life expectancy is 12 months or less.}} |- | {{|Health and Social Care Levy (Repeal) Act 2022|public|43|25-10-2022|maintained=y|archived=n|An Act to make provision for and in connection with the repeal of the Health and Social Care Levy Act 2021.}} |- | {{|Energy Prices Act 2022|public|44|25-10-2022|maintained=y|archived=n|An Act to make provision for controlling energy prices; to encourage the efficient use and supply of energy; and for other purposes connected to the energy crisis.}} |- | {{|Identity and Language (Northern Ireland) Act 2022|public|45|06-12-2022|maintained=y|archived=n|An Act to make provision about national and cultural identity and language in Northern Ireland.}} |- | {{|Product Security and Telecommunications Infrastructure Act 2022|public|46|06-12-2022|maintained=y|archived=n|An Act to make provision about the security of internet-connectable products and products capable of connecting to such products; to make provision about electronic communications infrastructure; and for connected purposes.}} |- | {{|Counsellors of State Act 2022|public|47|06-12-2022|maintained=y|archived=n|An Act to add His Royal Highness The Earl of Wessex and Her Royal Highness The Princess Royal to the persons to whom royal functions may be delegated as Counsellors of State.}} |- | {{|Northern Ireland (Executive Formation) Act 2022|public|48|06-12-2022|maintained=y|archived=n|An Act to make provision to extend the period following the Northern Ireland Assembly election of 5 May 2022 during which Ministers may be appointed and after which the Secretary of State must propose a date for another election; about the exercise of functions in the absence of Northern Ireland Ministers; to confer powers on the Secretary of State to determine salaries and other benefits for Members of the Assembly in respect of periods in which the Assembly is not functioning; and to confer powers on the Secretary of State to set the regional rate in Northern Ireland.}} |- | {{|Finance Act 2023|public|1|10-01-2023|maintained=y|archived=n|An Act to grant certain duties, to alter other duties, and to amend the law relating to the national debt and the public revenue, and to make further provision in connection with finance.}} |- | {{|Stamp Duty Land Tax (Temporary Relief) Act 2023|public|2|08-02-2023|maintained=y|archived=n|An Act to reduce, for a temporary period, the amount of stamp duty land tax chargeable on the acquisition of residential property.}} |- | {{|Northern Ireland Budget Act 2023|public|3|08-02-2023|maintained=y|archived=n|An Act to authorise the use for the public service of certain resources for the years ending 31 March 2023 and 2024 (including, for the year ending 31 March 2023, income); to authorise the issue out of the Consolidated Fund of Northern Ireland of certain sums for the service of those years; to authorise the use of those sums for specified purposes; to authorise the Department of Finance in Northern Ireland to borrow on the credit of those sums; and to repeal provisions superseded by this Act.}} |- | {{|Northern Ireland (Executive Formation and Organ and Tissue Donation) Act 2023|public|4|28-02-2023|maintained=y|archived=n|An Act to make provision to extend the period following the Northern Ireland Assembly election of 5 May 2022 during which Ministers may be appointed and after which the Secretary of State must propose a date for another election; to allow the Secretary of State to propose a date for another election before Ministers have been appointed; and to amend the procedure for making regulations defining permitted material for transplantation in Northern Ireland under section 3 of the Human Tissue Act 2004 in the period until the Presiding Officer and deputies of the Assembly are elected.}} |- | {{|Supply and Appropriation (Anticipation and Adjustments) Act 2023|public|5|23-03-2023|maintained=y|archived=n|An Act to make provision to extend the period following the Northern Ireland Assembly election of 5 May 2022 during which Ministers may be appointed and after which the Secretary of State must propose a date for another election; to allow the Secretary of State to propose a date for another election before Ministers have been appointed; and to amend the procedure for making regulations defining permitted material for transplantation in Northern Ireland under section 3 of the Human Tissue Act 2004 in the period until the Presiding Officer and deputies of the Assembly are elected.}} |- | {{|Genetic Technology (Precision Breeding) Act 2023|public|6|23-03-2023|maintained=y|archived=n|An Act to make provision about the release and marketing of, and risk assessments relating to, precision bred plants and animals, and the marketing of food and feed produced from such plants and animals; and for connected purposes.}} |- | {{|Social Security (Additional Payments) Act 2023|public|7|23-03-2023|maintained=y|archived=n|An Act to make provision about additional payments to recipients of means-tested benefits, tax credits and disability benefits.}} |- | {{|Seafarers Wages Act 2023|public|8|23-03-2023|maintained=y|archived=n|An Act to make provision in relation to the remuneration of seafarers who do not qualify for the national minimum wage.}} |- | {{|Trade (Australia and New Zealand) Act 2023|public|9|23-03-2023|maintained=y|archived=n|An Act to enable the implementation of, and the making of other provision in connection with, the government procurement Chapters of the United Kingdom's free trade agreements with Australia and New Zealand.}} |- | {{|UK Infrastructure Bank Act 2023|public|10|23-03-2023|maintained=y|archived=n|An Act to make provision about the UK Infrastructure Bank.}} |- | {{|Mobile Homes (Pitch Fees) Act 2023|public|11|02-05-2023|maintained=y|archived=n|An Act to amend the provisions about pitch fees in the Mobile Homes Act 1983; and for connected purposes.}} |- | {{|Ballot Secrecy Act 2023|public|12|02-05-2023|maintained=y|archived=n|An Act to make provision for ensuring the secrecy of ballots cast in polling stations at elections; and for connected purposes.}} |- | {{|Employment (Allocation of Tips) Act 2023|public|13|02-05-2023|maintained=y|archived=n|An Act to ensure that tips, gratuities and service charges paid by customers are allocated to workers.}} |- | {{|Pensions Dashboards (Prohibition of Indemnification) Act 2023|public|14|02-05-2023|maintained=y|archived=n|An Act to make provision about prohibiting the trustees and managers of pension schemes from being indemnified in respect of penalties imposed under pensions dashboards regulations.}} |- | {{|Public Order Act 2023|public|15|02-05-2023|maintained=y|archived=n|An Act to make provision for new offences relating to public order; to make provision about stop and search powers; to make provision about the exercise of police functions relating to public order; to make provision about proceedings by the Secretary of State relating to protest-related activities; to make provision about serious disruption prevention orders; and for connected purposes.}} |- | {{|Higher Education (Freedom of Speech) Act 2023|public|16|11-05-2023|maintained=y|archived=n|An Act to make provision in relation to freedom of speech and academic freedom in higher education institutions and in students' unions; and for connected purposes.}} |- | {{|Protection from Redundancy (Pregnancy and Family Leave) Act 2023|public|17|24-05-2023|maintained=y|archived=n|An Act to make provision about protection from redundancy during or after pregnancy or after periods of maternity, adoption or shared parental leave.}} |- | {{|Carer's Leave Act 2023|public|18|24-05-2023|maintained=y|archived=n|An Act to make provision about unpaid leave for employees with caring responsibilities.}} |- |{{|Electricity Transmission (Compensation) Act 2023|public|19|24-05-2023|maintained=y|archived=n|An Act to require proposals to be drawn up for the use of alternative dispute resolution processes to determine the compensation payable to landowners in certain cases where land is acquired for the purposes of electricity transmission.}} |- |{{|Neonatal Care (Leave and Pay) Act 2023|public|20|24-05-2023|maintained=y|archived=n|An Act to make provision about leave and pay for employees with responsibility for children receiving neonatal care.}} |- |{{|Northern Ireland (Interim Arrangements) Act 2023|public|21|24-05-2023|maintained=y|archived=n|An Act to extend the period during which departmental functions may be exercised in the absence of Ministers to cover the whole of the current period in which there is no Executive; to give the Secretary of State power, during that period, to commission advice and information for the purpose of developing options for raising more public revenue in Northern Ireland or otherwise improving the sustainability of public finances in Northern Ireland; and to require certain accounts and related documents to be laid before the House of Commons in periods in which the Northern Ireland Assembly is not functioning.}} |- |{{|Shark Fins Act 2023|public|22|29-06-2023|maintained=y|archived=n|An Act to prohibit the import and export of shark fins and to make provision relating to the removal of fins from sharks.}} |- |{{|Co-operatives, Mutuals and Friendly Societies Act 2023|public|23|29-06-2023|maintained=y|archived=n|An Act to make provision to permit the capital surplus of co-operatives, mutuals and friendly societies to be non-distributable; and for connected purposes. }} |- |{{|Child Support Collection (Domestic Abuse) Act 2023|public|24|29-06-2023|maintained=y|archived=n|An Act to make provision enabling the making of arrangements for the collection of child support maintenance in cases involving domestic abuse.}} |- |{{|Offenders (Day of Release from Detention) Act 2023|public|25|29-06-2023|maintained=y|archived=n|An Act to make provision about the days on which offenders are released from detention; and for connected purposes.}} |- |{{|Supported Housing (Regulatory Oversight) Act 2023|public|26|29-06-2023|maintained=y|archived=n|An Act to make provision about the regulation of supported exempt accommodation; to make provision about local authority oversight of, and enforcement powers relating to, the provision of supported exempt accommodation; and for connected purposes.}} |- |{{|British Nationality (Regularisation of Past Practice) Act 2023|public|27|29-06-2023|maintained=y|archived=n|An Act to make provision for immigration restrictions to be disregarded for the purposes of the British Nationality Act 1981 (Note: British Nationality Act 1981 (c. 61)) in historical cases in which such restrictions were in practice disregarded.}} |- |{{|Retained EU Law (Revocation and Reform) Act 2023|public|28|29-06-2023|maintained=y|archived=n|An Act to revoke certain retained EU law; to make provision relating to the interpretation of retained EU law and to its relationship with other law; to make provision relating to powers to modify retained EU law; to enable the restatement, replacement or updating of certain retained EU law; to enable the updating of restatements and replacement provision; to abolish the business impact target; and for connected purposes.}} |- |{{|Financial Services and Markets Act 2023|public|29|29-06-2023|maintained=y|archived=n|An Act to make provision about the regulation of financial services and markets; and for connected purposes.}} |- |{{|Finance (No. 2) Act 2023|public|30|11-07-2023|maintained=y|archived=n|An Act to make provision in connection with finance.}} |- |{{|Supply and Appropriation (Main Estimates) Act 2023|public|31|11-07-2023|maintained=y|archived=n|An Act to authorise the use of resources for the year ending with 31 March 2024; to authorise both the issue of sums out of the Consolidated Fund and the application of income for that year; and to appropriate the supply authorised for that year by this Act and by the Supply and Appropriation (Anticipation and Adjustments) Act 2023. (Note: Supply and Appropriation (Anticipation and Adjustments) Act 2023 (c. 5)) }} |- |{{|National Security Act 2023|public|32|11-07-2023|maintained=y|archived=n|An Act to make provision about threats to national security from espionage, sabotage and persons acting for foreign powers; about the extra-territorial application of Part 2 of the Serious Crime Act 2007; (Note: Serious Crime Act 2007 (c. 27)) for the registration of certain arrangements with, and activities of, specified persons and foreign powers; about the award of damages in proceedings relating to national security and the payment of damages at risk of being used for the purposes of terrorism; about the availability of legal aid to persons connected with terrorism; to amend the Terrorism Act 2000; (Note: Terrorism Act 2000 (c. 11)) and for connected purposes.}} |- |{{|Employment Relations (Flexible Working) Act 2023|public|33|20-07-2023|maintained=y|archived=n|An Act to make provision in relation to the right of employees and other workers to request variations to particular terms and conditions of employment, including working hours, times and locations.}} |- |{{|Equipment Theft (Prevention) Act 2023|public|34|20-07-2023|maintained=y|archived=n|An Act to make provision to prevent the theft and re-sale of equipment and tools used by tradespeople and agricultural and other businesses; and for connected purposes.}} |- |{{|Child Support (Enforcement) Act 2023|public|35|20-07-2023|maintained=y|archived=n|An Act to make provision about the enforcement of child support maintenance and other maintenance; and for connected purposes.}} |- |{{|Social Housing (Regulation) Act 2023|public|36|20-07-2023|maintained=y|archived=n|An Act to make provision about the regulation of social housing; about the terms of approved schemes for the investigation of housing complaints; about the powers and duties of a housing ombudsman appointed under an approved scheme; about hazards affecting social housing; and for connected purposes.}} |- |{{|Illegal Migration Act 2023|public|37|20-07-2023|maintained=y|archived=n|An Act to make provision for and in connection with the removal from the United Kingdom of persons who have entered or arrived in breach of immigration control; to make provision about detention for immigration purposes; to make provision about unaccompanied children; to make provision about victims of slavery or human trafficking; to make provision about leave to enter or remain in the United Kingdom; to make provision about citizenship; to make provision about the inadmissibility of certain protection and certain human rights claims relating to immigration; to make provision about the maximum number of persons entering the United Kingdom annually using safe and legal routes; to make further provision about the credibility of claimants making asylum and human rights claims; and for connected purposes.}} |- |{{|Electronic Trade Documents Act 2023|public|38|20-07-2023|maintained=y|archived=n|An Act to make provision about electronic trade documents; and for connected purposes.}} |- |{{|Strikes (Minimum Service Levels) Act 2023|public|39|20-07-2023|maintained=y|archived=n|An Act to make provision about minimum service levels in connection with the taking by trade unions of strike action relating to certain services.}} |- |{{|Lifelong Learning (Higher Education Fee Limits) Act 2023|public|40|18-09-2023|maintained=y|archived=n|An Act to make provision about the determination of the fee limit for higher education courses provided by registered English higher education providers subject to a fee limit condition; and for connected purposes.}} |- |{{|Northern Ireland Troubles (Legacy and Reconciliation) Act 2023|public|41|18-09-2023|maintained=y|archived=n|An Act to address the legacy of the Northern Ireland Troubles and promote reconciliation by establishing an Independent Commission for Reconciliation and Information Recovery, limiting criminal investigations, legal proceedings, inquests and police complaints, extending the prisoner release scheme in the Northern Ireland (Sentences) Act 1998, (Note: Northern Ireland (Sentences) Act 1998 (c. 35)) and providing for experiences to be recorded and preserved and for events to be studied and memorialised, and to provide for the validity of interim custody orders.}} |- |{{|Powers of Attorney Act 2023|public|42|18-09-2023|maintained=y|archived=n|An Act to make provision about lasting powers of attorney; to make provision about proof of instruments creating powers of attorney; and for connected purposes.}} |- |{{|Northern Ireland Budget (No. 2) Act 2023|public|43|18-09-2023|maintained=y|archived=n|An Act to authorise the use for the public service of certain resources for the year ending 31 March 2024 (including income); to authorise the issue out of the Consolidated Fund of Northern Ireland of certain sums for the service of that year; to authorise the use of those sums for specified purposes; to authorise the Department of Finance in Northern Ireland to borrow on the credit of those sums; and to repeal a spent provision.}} |- |{{|Pensions (Extension of Automatic Enrolment) Act 2023|public|44|18-09-2023|maintained=y|archived=n|An Act to make provision about the extension of pensions automatic enrolment to jobholders under the age of 22; to make provision about the lower qualifying earnings threshold for automatic enrolment; and for connected purposes.}} |- |{{|Animals (Low-Welfare Activities Abroad) Act 2023|public|45|18-09-2023|maintained=y|archived=n|An Act to prohibit the sale and advertising of activities abroad which involve low standards of welfare for animals.}} |- |{{|Workers (Predictable Terms and Conditions) Act 2023|public|46|18-09-2023|maintained=y|archived=n|An Act to give workers and agency workers the right to request more predictable terms and conditions of work.}} |- |{{|Protection from Sex-based Harassment in Public Act 2023|public|47|18-09-2023|maintained=y|archived=n|An Act to make provision about causing intentional harassment, alarm or distress to a person in public where the behaviour is done because of that person's sex; and for connected purposes.}} |- |{{|Veterans Advisory and Pensions Committees Act 2023|public|48|18-09-2023|maintained=y|archived=n|An Act to make provision about veterans advisory and pensions committees; and for connected purposes.}} |- |{{|Firearms Act 2023|public|49|18-09-2023|maintained=y|archived=n|An Act to make provision about the regulation of certain rifle ranges and shooting galleries; to make provision for an offence in relation to the possession of component parts of ammunition; and for connected purposes.}} |- |{{|Online Safety Act 2023|public|50|26-10-2023|maintained=y|archived=n|An Act to make provision for and in connection with the regulation by OFCOM of certain internet services; for and in connection with communications offences; and for connected purposes.}} |- |{{|Worker Protection (Amendment of Equality Act 2010) Act 2023|public|51|26-10-2023|maintained=y|archived=n|An Act to make provision in relation to the duties of employers and the protection of workers under the Equality Act 2010. (Note: Equality Act 2010 (c. 15)) }} |- |{{|Energy Act 2023|public|52|26-10-2023|maintained=y|archived=n|An Act to make provision about energy production and security and the regulation of the energy market, including provision about the licensing of carbon dioxide transport and storage; about commercial arrangements for carbon capture and storage and for hydrogen production and transportation; about new technology, including low-carbon heat schemes and hydrogen grid trials; about the Independent System Operator and Planner; about gas and electricity industry codes; about financial support for persons carrying on energy-intensive activities; about heat networks; about energy smart appliances and load control; about the energy performance of premises; about energy savings opportunity schemes; about the resilience of the core fuel sector; about offshore energy production, including environmental protection, licensing and decommissioning; about the civil nuclear sector, including the Civil Nuclear Constabulary and pensions; and for connected purposes. }} |- |{{|Non-Domestic Rating Act 2023|public|53|26-10-2023|maintained=y|archived=n|An Act to make provision about non-domestic rating.}} |- |{{|Procurement Act 2023|public|54|26-10-2023|maintained=y|archived=n|An Act to make provision about procurement.}} |- |{{|Levelling-up and Regeneration Act 2023 |public|55|26-10-2023|maintained=y|archived=n|An Act to make provision for the setting of levelling-up missions and reporting on progress in delivering them; about local democracy; about town and country planning; about Community Infrastructure Levy; about the imposition of Infrastructure Levy; about environmental outcome reports for certain consents and plans; about nutrient pollution standards; about regeneration; about the compulsory purchase of land; about information and records relating to land, the environment or heritage; about the registration of short-term rental properties; for the provision for pavement licences to be permanent; about governance of the Royal Institution of Chartered Surveyors; about the charging of fees in connection with marine licences; for a body to replace the Health and Safety Executive as the building safety regulator; about the transfer of land for Academy schools; about the review of maps of open country and registered common land; about the regulation of childminding; about qualifying leases under the Building Safety Act 2022; (Note: Building Safety Act 2022 (c. 30)) about road user charging schemes in London; about National Parks, areas of outstanding natural beauty and the Broads; and for connected purposes. }} |- |{{|Economic Crime and Corporate Transparency Act 2023|public|56|26-10-2023|maintained=y|archived=n|An Act to make provision about economic crime and corporate transparency; to make further provision about companies, limited partnerships and other kinds of corporate entity; and to make provision about the registration of overseas entities.}} }}
