= Emmeline and Christabel Pankhurst Memorial =

Memorial in London

Coordinates: 51°29′52″N 0°07′31″W

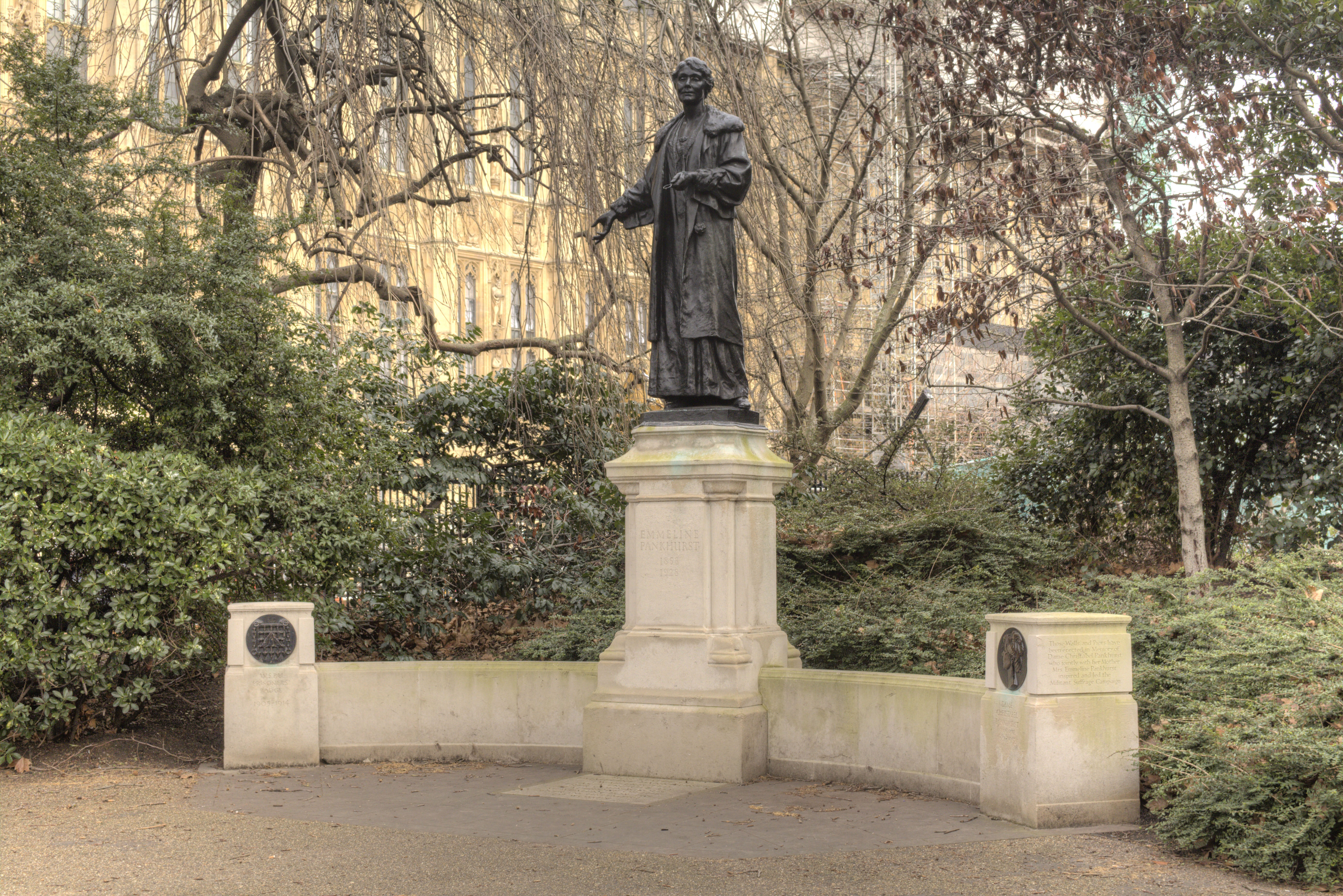
The memorial in January 2015

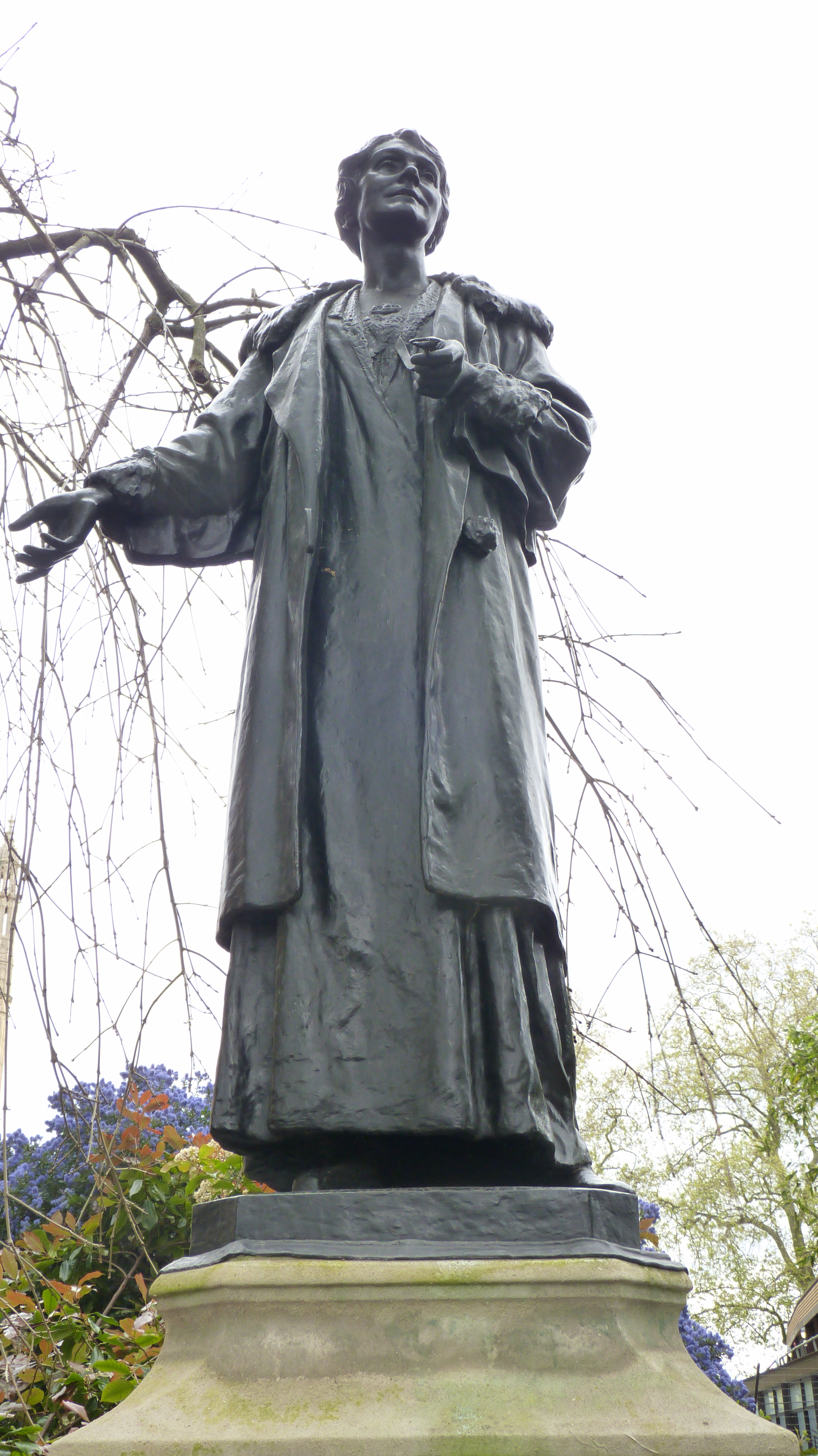

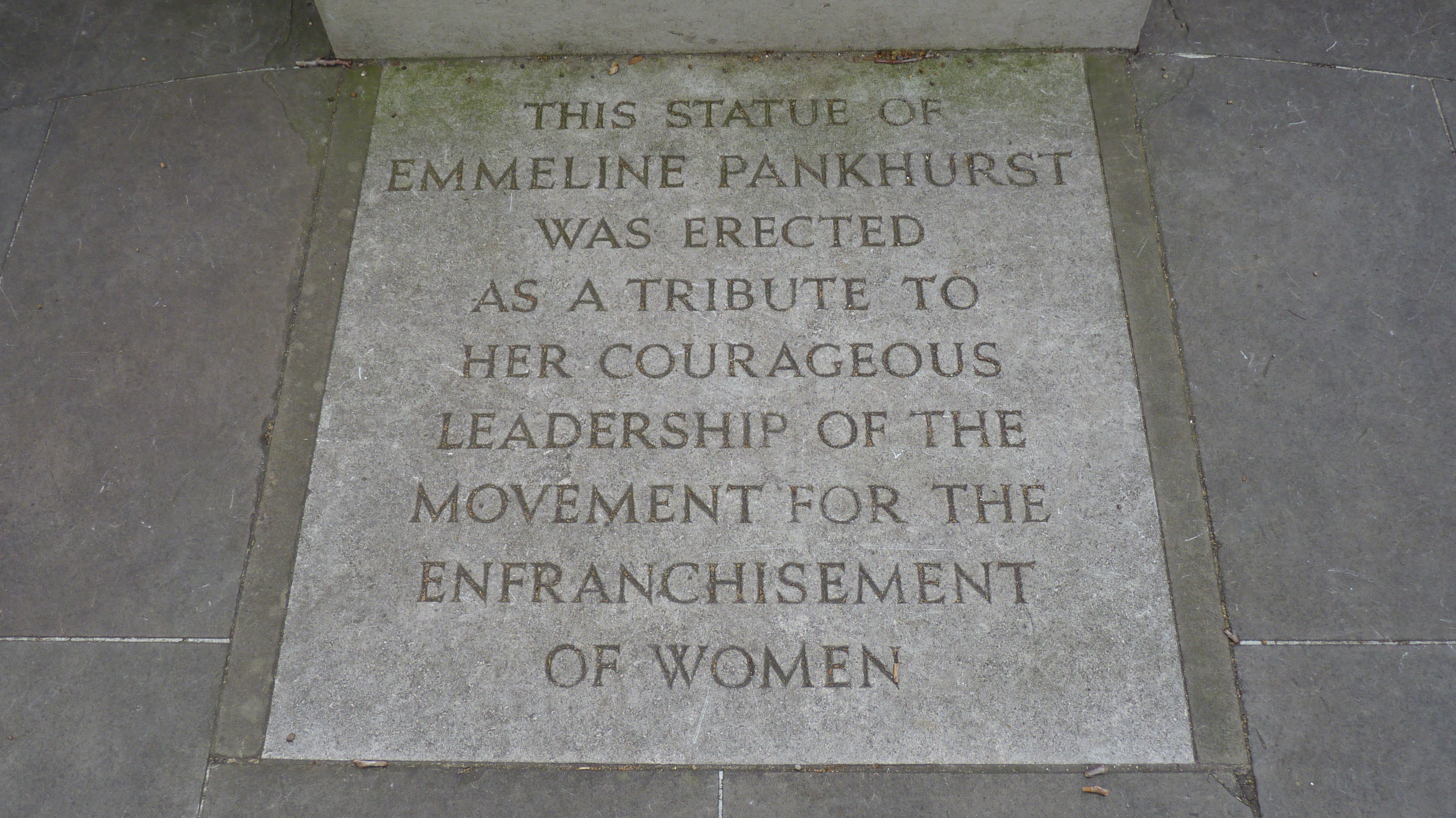

The Emmeline and Christabel Pankhurst Memorial is a memorial in London to Emmeline Pankhurst and her daughter Christabel, two of the foremost British suffragettes. It stands at the entrance to Victoria Tower Gardens, south of Victoria Tower at the southwest corner of the Palace of Westminster. Its main feature is a bronze statue of Emmeline Pankhurst by Arthur George Walker, unveiled in 1930. In 1958 the statue was relocated to its current site and the bronze reliefs commemorating Christabel Pankhurst were added.

An image of the statue appeared on a 9d UK postage stamp designed by Clive Abbott which commemorated the 50th anniversary of the Representation of the People Act, 1918 which gave some women the right to vote for the first time.

== Campaign for and unveiling of the memorial ==
Shortly after Emmeline Pankhurst's death in 1928 a Pankhurst Memorial Fund was established, with her fellow suffragettes Rosamund Massy and Katherine "Kitty" Marshall (Pankhurst's former bodyguard in the Women's Social and Political Union) as joint secretaries. The fund's objectives were to arrange a headstone for her grave, to acquire Georgina Brakenbury's portrait of Pankhurst and to erect a public statue. Some spectators, such as Nancy Astor, believed the idea of a statue impractical, noting that Pankhurst herself did not believe she was "statuesque" and the fact that the British public were facing austere times, which would impose financial constraints on the project. In reality raising the money, which was largely organised by The Suffragette's editor Rachel Barrett, was not the issue; finding a location for the statue was the real problem. Although the Chief Commissioner of Public Works, Sir Lionel Earle, was sympathetic to their cause, he believed that it would be impractical to place the statue in Westminster. After several locations were rejected Marshall secured permission to erect the statue in a corner of Victoria Tower Gardens near the Houses of Parliament. Though this required a special Parliamentary bill, the Conservative MP William Bull ensured its smooth passage.

A bronze statue of Emmeline Pankhurst, with arms outstretched as if addressing a rally, was sculpted by Arthur George Walker; Sir Herbert Baker was the architect of the plinth. As well as covering the cost of the plinth and statue the fund paid the Ministry of Works £160 to have the statue cleaned in perpetuity and a further £330 to always have a plant placed in a vase next to the statue.

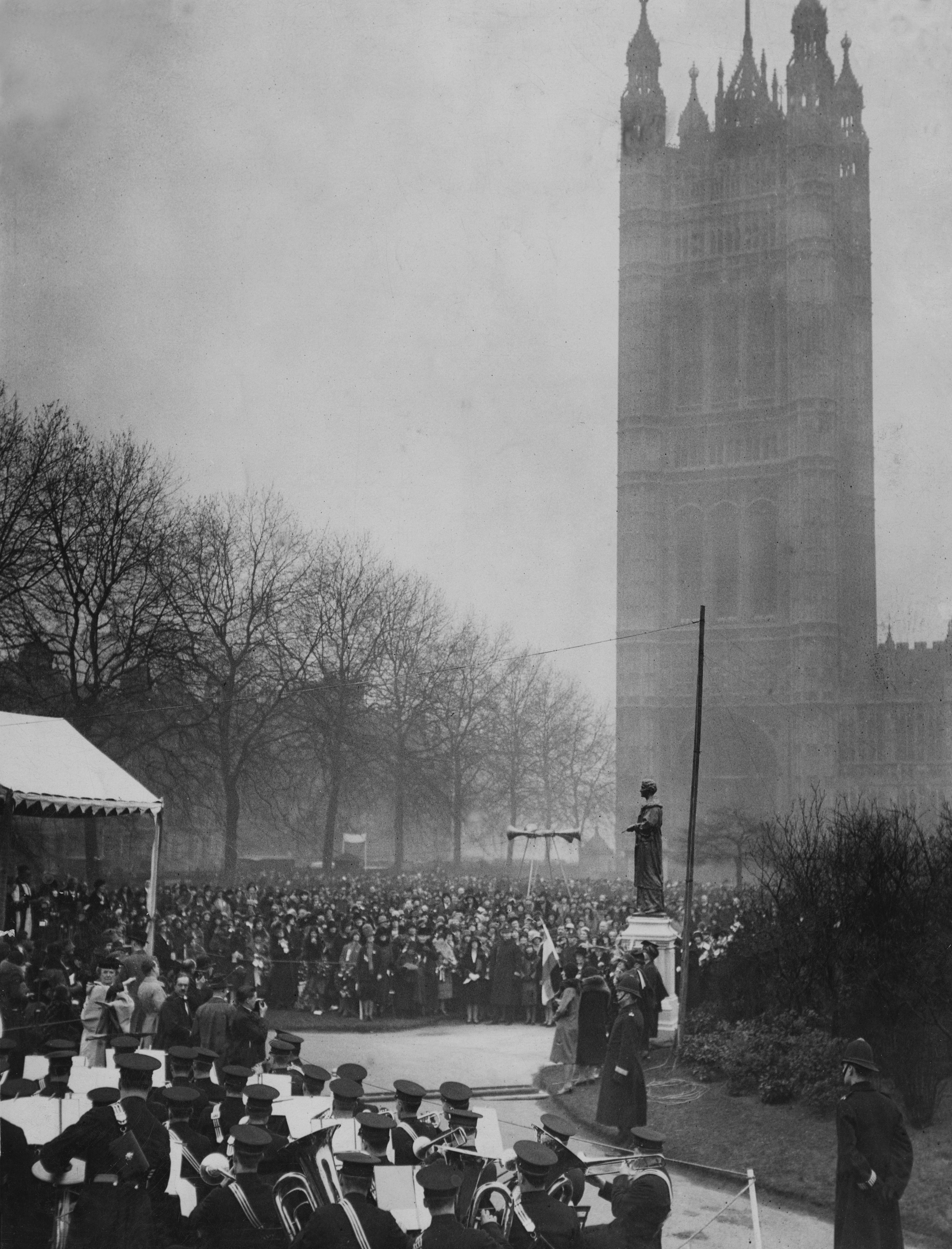
The statue's unveiling on 6 March 1930

The statue was unveiled by the Prime Minister, Stanley Baldwin, on 6 March 1930. Marshall had arranged for two facing platforms to be erected near the statue, one for the three speakers, Baldwin, Lady Rhondda and Fred Pethick-Lawrence, and the other for a band. Loudspeakers were provided and the stages draped in the colours of the WSPU. In Baldwin's speech he said: "I say with no fear of contradiction, that whatever view posterity may take, Mrs. Pankhurst has won for herself a niche in the Temple of Fame which will last for all time." The composer Ethel Smyth, a close friend of Pankhurst's, conducted the Metropolitan Police Band during the unveiling, playing an arrangement of her song "The March of the Women" and music from her opera The Wreckers. Princess Sophia Duleep Singh, suffragette and daughter of the last Maharaja of the Sikh Empire, was President of the Committee tasked with providing flower decorations at the unveiling. "The March of the Women" was the anthem of the women's suffrage movement.

== Relocation in 1958 ==
In 1958 the statue was moved from its original position in the south of the gardens to a new site further north, and a low stone screen was built flanking the statue, terminating at either end with bronze medallions sculpted by Peter Hills. These depict, on the left, the "prison brooch" or "badge" of the WSPU, and, on the right, a profile bust of Christabel Pankhurst, who died in 1958. The unveiling of this dual memorial was performed on 13 July 1959 by the Lord Chancellor, Lord Kilmuir. Sylvia Pankhurst died in 1960; she is not commemorated. The statue was granted a Grade II listing in 1970.

== Proposed relocation in 2018 ==
In August 2018, a group called "The Emmeline Pankhurst Trust Limited" led by former Conservative MP Neil Thorne applied for planning permission to remove the statue from its site next to Parliament to the private grounds of Regent's University London. 889 objections were received, including from MPs Caroline Flint and Vicky Ford, and campaigner Caroline Criado-Perez, and the application was withdrawn on 14 September.

Components of the memorial
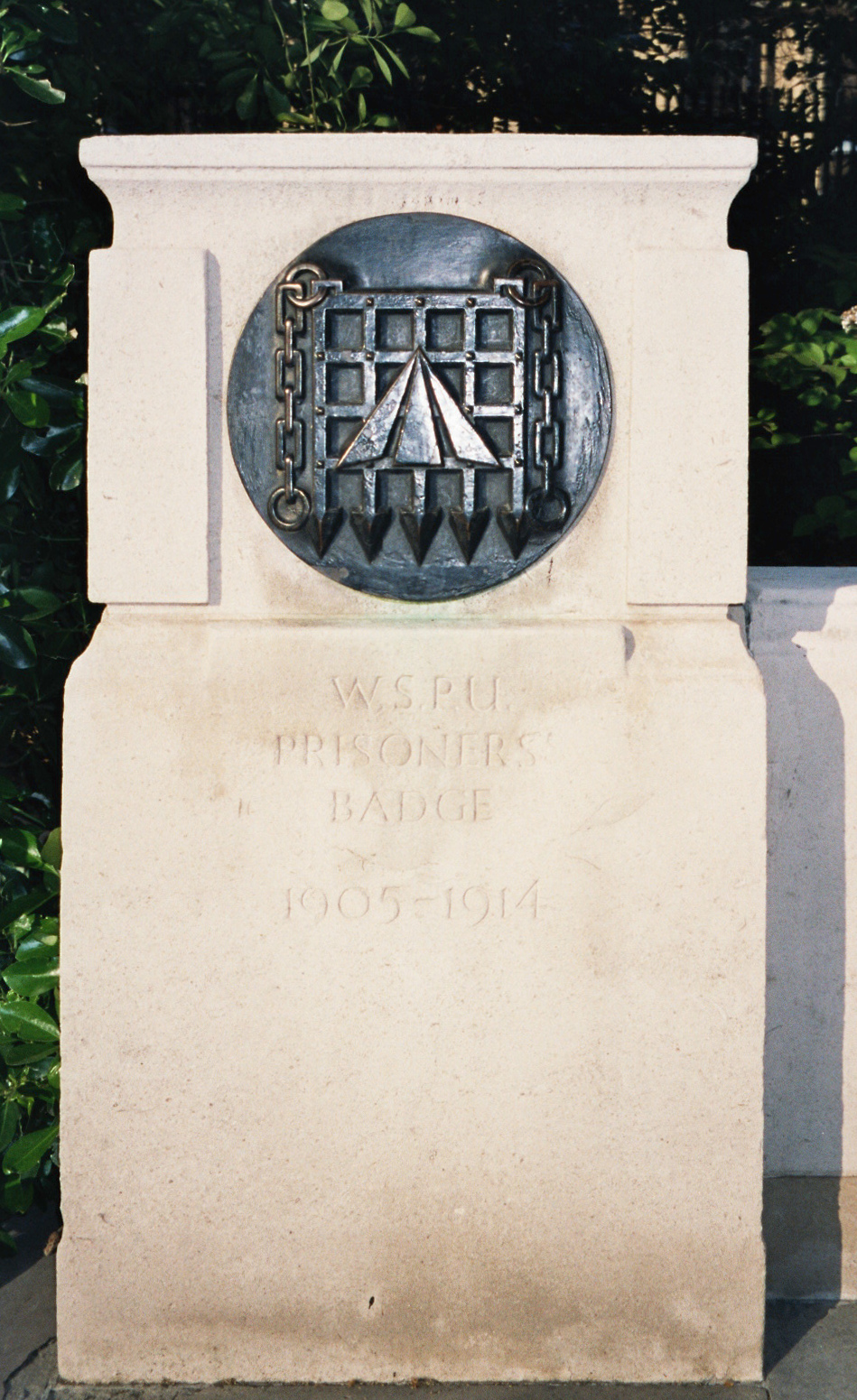
Left, the prisoners' badge of the WSPU, known as the "Holloway brooch", designed by Sylvia Pankhurst in 1909

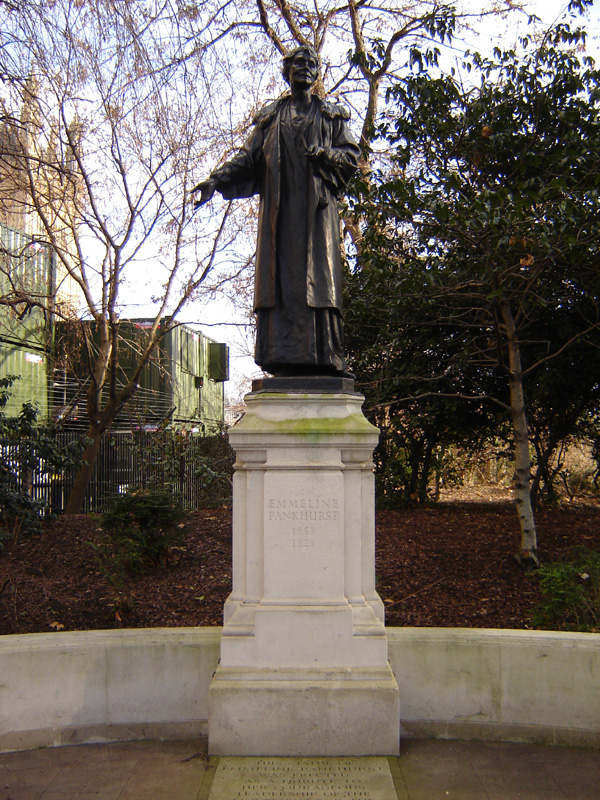
Centre, the Emmeline Pankhurst statue

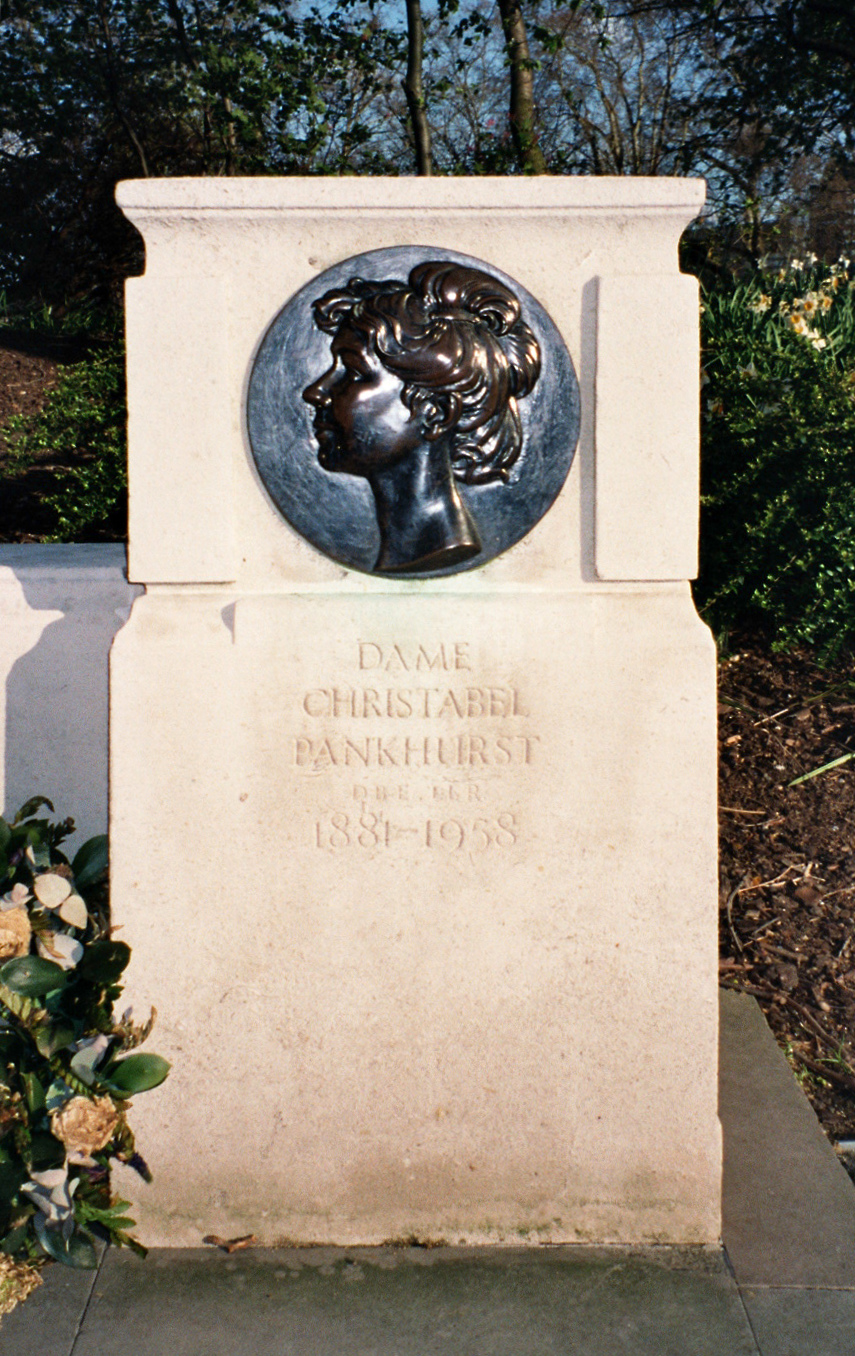
Right, a portrait medallion of Dame Christabel Pankhurst, 1880–1958

== See also ==
- Rise up, Women (Emmeline Pankhurst statue)
- List of monuments and memorials to women's suffrage

== Bibliography ==
- Pugh, Martin (2013). The Pankhursts: The History of One Radical Family. Random House. ISBN 9781448162680.
