= Victoria Tower Gardens =

Public park in London, England

Coordinates: 51°29′49″N 0°7′30″W

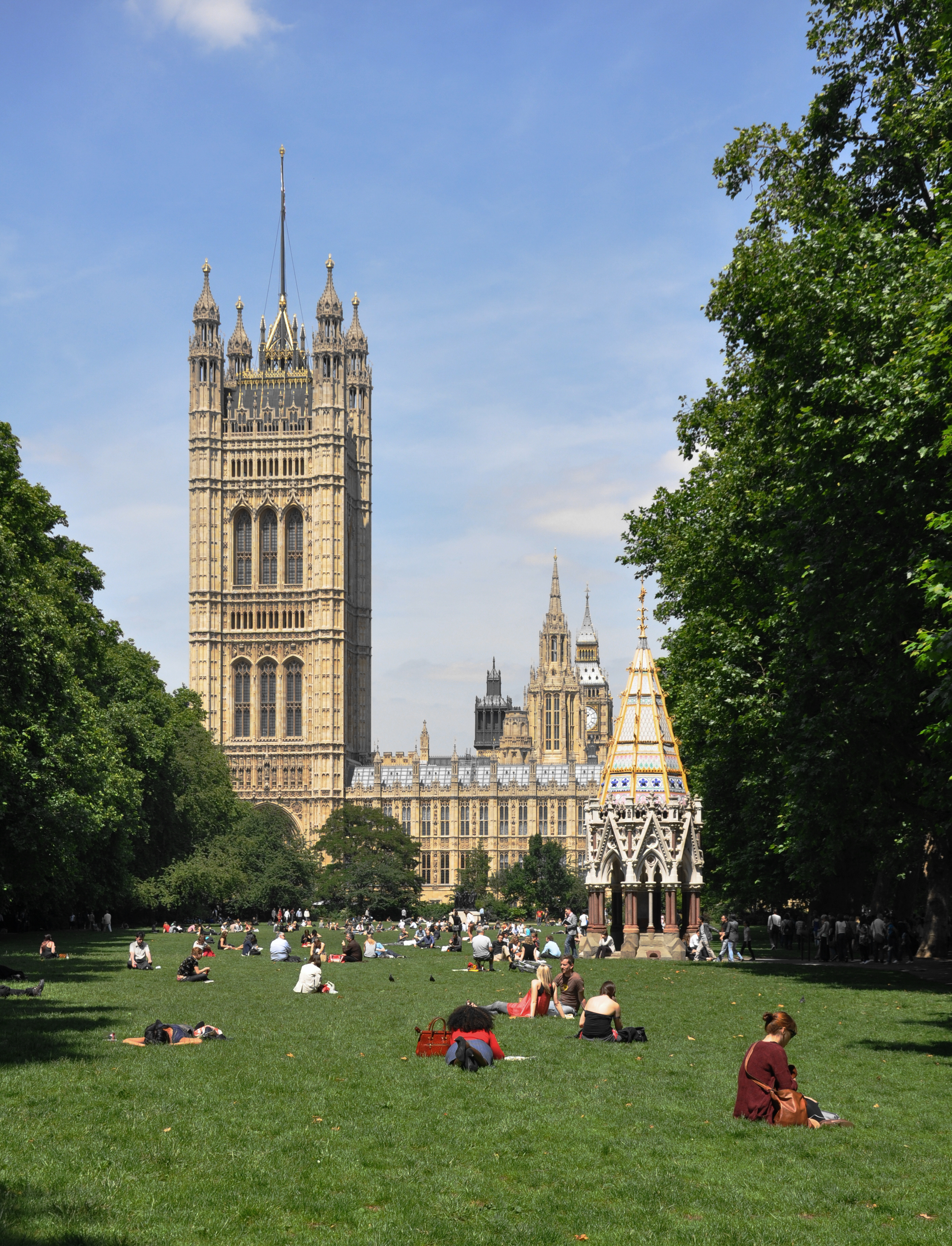
Victoria Tower Gardens, 2011, with the Buxton Memorial Fountain and the Palace of Westminster in the background

Victoria Tower Gardens is a public park along the north bank of the River Thames in London, adjacent to the Victoria Tower, at the south-western corner of the Palace of Westminster. The park extends southwards from the Palace to Lambeth Bridge, between Millbank and the river. It forms part of the Thames Embankment.

Victoria Tower Gardens is a Grade II* listed park created in two stages in 1879–81 and 1913–14. It is in a conservation area, is partly within the UNESCO World Heritage Site of Westminster, and is designated a zone of Monument Saturation.

== History ==
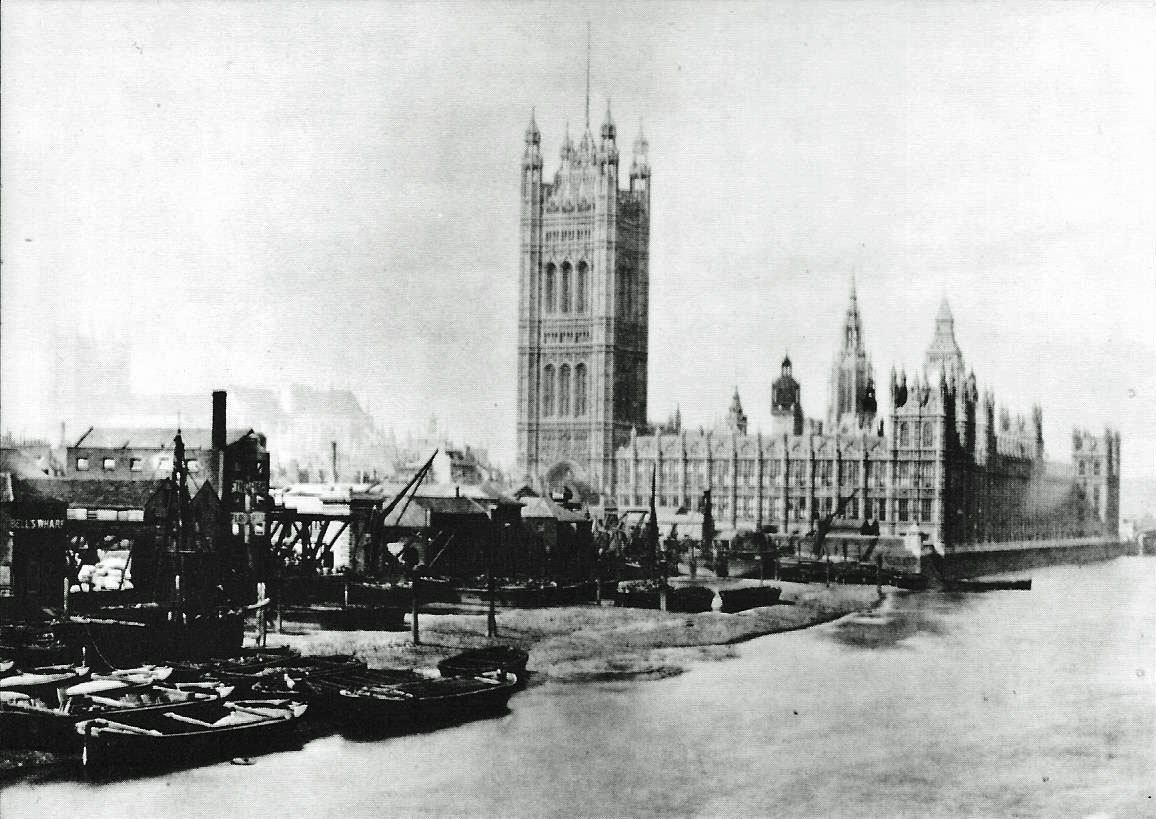
The site of Victoria Tower Gardens in 1865.

The northern part of the gardens was acquired by the government under the Houses of Parliament Act 1867 to reduce the fire risk to the Palace of Westminster from the wharves there. There was disagreement about whether at least some of the land should be built on, but eventually the newspaper retailer William Henry Smith donated £1,000 towards laying it out as an open space and Parliament paid the remaining £1,400 needed. The gardens opened in 1881. The government promised Smith that the land would be maintained as a recreation ground.

A private scheme to rebuild the area south of the gardens was discussed in Parliament in 1898 in the Victoria Embankment extension and St John's Improvement Bill, and was rejected because it did not include extending the Gardens. London County Council then brought forward its own scheme for widening Millbank, extending the Thames embankment and enlarging the open space southwards to Lambeth Bridge. The Commissioners of Works were expected to give up a small part of the existing gardens for the road widening, and, to honour the promise to Smith, insisted that it be expressly provided in the act authorising the scheme that the new land between Millbank and the river be laid out as a garden. Consequently the London County Council (Improvements) Act 1900, which authorised the scheme, provided that the new land between Millbank and the Thames should be "laid out and maintained ... for use as a garden open to the public and as an integral part of the existing Victoria Tower Garden". The new land was laid out as a garden in 1913–14 and opened to the public on 30 June 1914.

A number of wharves were compulsorily purchased under the 1900 act, including Dorset Wharf which was purchased from George Taverner Miller, son of Taverner John Miller, from where he ran a "sperm oil merchants and spermaceti refining" business. The effects from this business and others were sold in 1905.

The original gardens had a formal layout, with a central shrubbery. The garden was replanned with a less formal layout in 1913–14, with a shrubbery further south. In 1956 the shrubbery and trees in the lawns were removed to provide more of a parkland atmosphere and an uninterrupted view of the Palace of Westminster. The changes included (in 1957) erection in the gardens of the Buxton Memorial. The present layout is essentially that of 1956–57.

== Features ==
The park features:

- A cast of the sculpture The Burghers of Calais by Auguste Rodin, purchased by the British government in 1911 and positioned in the gardens in 1914.
- A 1930 statue of the suffragette Emmeline Pankhurst by Arthur George Walker, now entitled the Emmeline and Christabel Pankhurst Memorial
- The Buxton Memorial Fountain – originally constructed in Parliament Square, this was removed in 1940 and placed in its present position in 1957. It was commissioned by Charles Buxton MP to commemorate the Slavery Abolition Act 1833 which abolished slavery in British-ruled territories, dedicated to his father Thomas Fowell Buxton, and designed by Gothic architect Samuel Sanders Teulon (1812–1873) in 1865.
- A stone wall with two modern-style goats with kids – situated at the southern end of the gardens.
- From 4 to 11 August 2014 the light installation spectra by Japanese artist Ryoji Ikeda was situated in the gardens to commemorate the centenary of the start of the First World War.
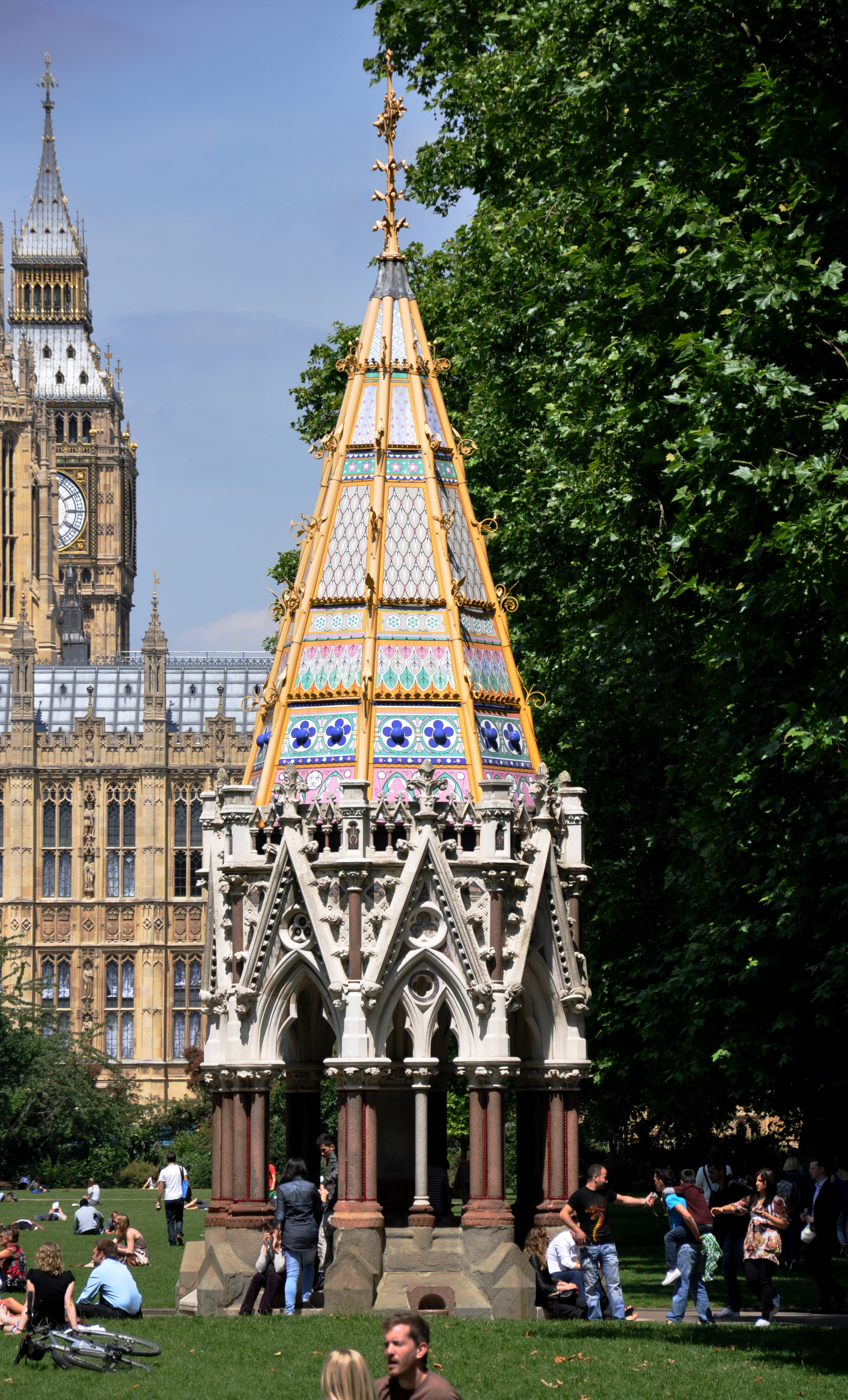
Buxton Memorial Fountain

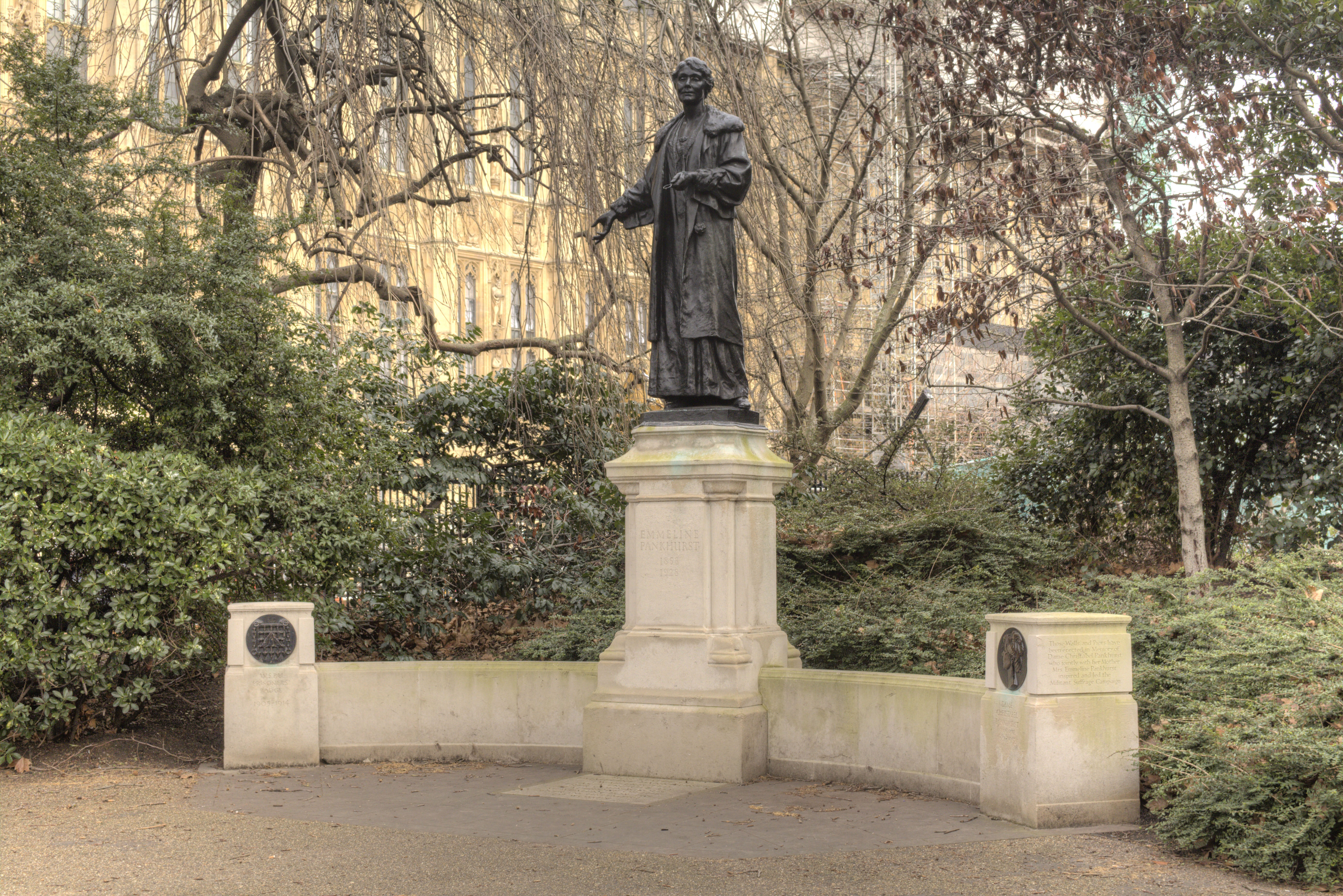
Emmeline and Christabel Pankhurst Memorial

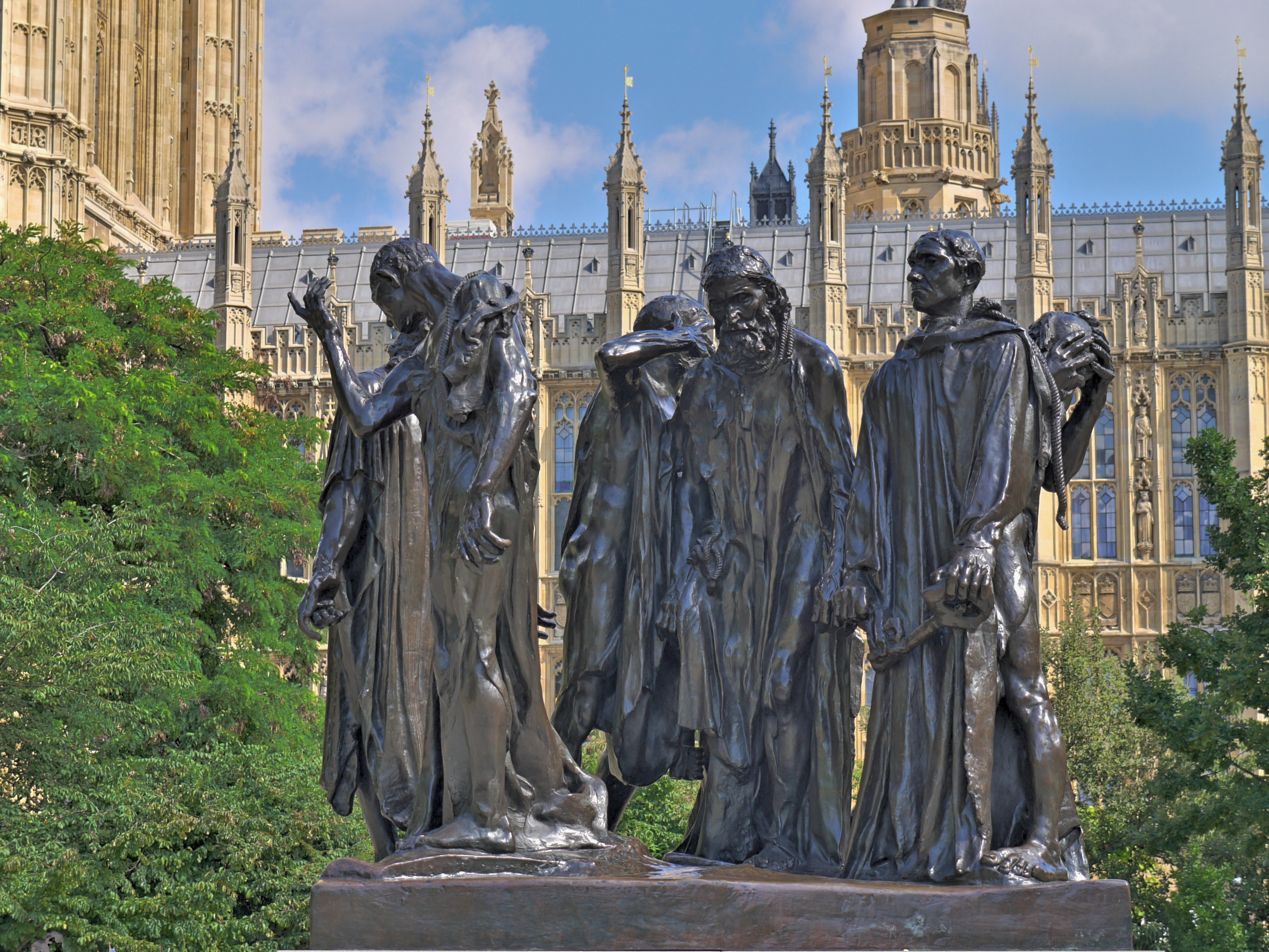
Rodin: The Burghers of Calais

=== Proposed UK Holocaust Memorial ===
In January 2015, Prime Minister David Cameron announced plans for a new national UK Holocaust Memorial and associated learning facilities to be established in central London. Several sites were initially proposed, including the Imperial War Museum, Potter's Field near City Hall, and a site on Millbank in Westminster. On 27 January 2016, Cameron announced that Victoria Tower Gardens had been chosen as the location for the memorial.

An international design competition was held, and in October 2017 the UK Holocaust Memorial Foundation announced a proposal by Adjaye Associates, in collaboration with Ron Arad Architects, as the selected design. The proposals were subsequently submitted for planning permission to Westminster City Council.

The proposals attracted significant public and institutional opposition on grounds including the impact on Victoria Tower Gardens as a historic public park and on the heritage setting of the Palace of Westminster, and prompted objections from advisers to UNESCO such as ICOMOS.

On 8 April 2022, the High Court quashed the planning permission for the Holocaust Memorial and Learning Centre, finding that the statutory restrictions applying to Victoria Tower Gardens under the London County Council (Improvements) Act 1900 had not been lawfully disapplied.

The Government subsequently pursued a hybrid bill to remove those statutory restrictions in relation to the site. During the House of Lords select committee stage, petitions were submitted against the Bill raising concerns including the effect on Victoria Tower Gardens and related issues of access and security. The bill's progress is summarised in Commons Library briefing material.

The Holocaust Memorial Act 2026 received Royal Assent on 22 January 2026 and disapplies the relevant provisions of the London County Council (Improvements) Act 1900 for the land at Victoria Tower Gardens, enabling a new planning decision to be taken in respect of the project.

The gardens were included in Europa Nostra’s 7 Most Endangered Programme in 2025.

== Transport ==
The nearest London Underground stations are Westminster and Pimlico.
