= Holocaust Memorial Act 2026 =

Act of the Parliament of the United Kingdom

Holocaust Memorial Act 2026 (Note: Section 3(3).)
- Act of Parliament
- Parliament of the United Kingdom
- Long title: An Act to make provision for expenditure by the Secretary of State and the removal of restrictions in respect of certain land for or in connection with the construction of a Holocaust Memorial and Learning Centre.
- Citation: 2026 c. 3
- Introduced by: Michael Gove MP (Commons); Lord Khan of Burnley (Lords)
- Territorial extent: England and Wales (Note: Section 3(1).)

Dates
- Royal assent: 22 January 2026
- Commencement: 22 March 2026 (Note: Section 3(2).)
Other legislation
Relates to	London County Council (Improvements) Act 1900

Status: Current legislation

History of passage through Parliament

Text of statute as originally enacted

Revised text of statute as amended

Holocaust Memorial Act 2026 (c. 3) is an act of the Parliament of the United Kingdom that provides statutory authority for public expenditure on the construction, operation and maintenance of a Holocaust Memorial and Learning Centre in London. The act also disapplies provisions of the London County Council (Improvements) Act 1900 that restricted development on the proposed site at Victoria Tower Gardens, Westminster. It received royal assent on 22 January 2026 and extends to England and Wales.

The act followed on from a legal battle at the High Court regarding planning permissions on Victoria Tower Gardens, ultimately culminating in the High Court rejecting the government's final appeal in July 2022.

== Contents ==
The act contains three sections:

- Section 1 – Expenditure relating to a Holocaust Memorial and Learning Centre: authorises the Secretary of State to incur public expenditure for the construction, operation, maintenance and associated works of a Holocaust Memorial and Learning Centre.
- Section 2 – Removal of restrictions in relation to certain land: disapplies restrictions in section 8 of the London County Council (Improvements) Act 1900 that would otherwise prevent development on the land at Victoria Tower Gardens.
- Section 3 – Extent, commencement and short title: provides that the act extends to England and Wales, comes into force two months after royal assent, and may be cited as the Holocaust Memorial Act 2026.

== Petitions against the act ==
Between May and July 2024, 18 petitions opposing the legislation were submitted to the House of Lords Select Committee on the Holocaust Memorial Bill. While the grounds for objection varied, recurring themes included concerns about the impact on Victoria Tower Gardens as a protected public space, the suitability of the proposed site given its limited size, security risks associated with the memorial's proximity to Parliament, and public safety implications in light of regular protests in the surrounding area, including demonstrations related to the Gaza war, as well as concerns about security risks and antisemitic threats in the UK and Europe.

Lord Hamilton of Epsom described Victoria Tower Gardens as "too small to take a large memorial building" and warned that coach parking on the Embankment would add to existing congestion.

Members of the Buxton family and the Thomas Fowell Buxton Society argued that the proposed Holocaust Memorial and Learning Centre would harm the setting and prominence of the Grade II* listed Buxton Memorial in Victoria Tower Gardens. They stated that the scale and proximity of the new structure would visually dominate and crowd the existing monument, undermining its commemorative function and historic significance. The petitioners maintained that this impact arose from the decision to combine a large learning centre with the memorial on a constrained site, and argued that a memorial of more limited scale could be accommodated without detriment to the Buxton Memorial, or that educational facilities should be located elsewhere.

The London Historic Parks and Gardens Trust petitioned the House of Lords select committee, arguing that the proposed Holocaust Memorial and Learning Centre would cause material harm to Victoria Tower Gardens, a Grade II listed historic public park. The trust stated that the development would result in a permanent loss of protected green space and an irreversible change in the character of the gardens from a public park to a civic and security-managed space. It further argued that the scale of the proposed scheme would damage the setting of existing memorials within the gardens, including the Grade II* listed Buxton Memorial, and that alternative sites or the reuse of existing buildings had not been adequately considered. The trust called for restrictions limiting any development to a memorial of proportionate scale, with protections to prevent harm to existing monuments and to preserve public access to the park.

Baroness Deech, joined by Holocaust survivors and relatives of victims, petitioned the House of Lords select committee arguing that the proposed Holocaust Memorial and Learning Centre at Victoria Tower Gardens was inappropriate in scale and conception for the site, and that the learning centre, as designed, would be inadequate for the educational aims originally set out in the 2015 Holocaust Commission report. The petitioners criticised the decision to combine a large memorial with an underground learning centre on a constrained site, contending that this had reduced the learning centre to a limited "visitor centre" and that alternative locations for educational facilities had not been properly considered. They also raised concerns about the impact of the development on the gardens, on the setting of the Buxton Memorial, and on the Outstanding Universal Value of the Palace of Westminster World Heritage Site, citing UNESCO objections. The petitioners called for renewed consultation, relocation of the learning centre away from Victoria Tower Gardens, and a memorial of more modest scale.
