= Statue of Nelson Mandela =

Statue of Nelson Mandela may refer to:

- Statue of Nelson Mandela, Cape Town City Hall, South Africa
- Statue of Nelson Mandela, Johannesburg, South Africa
- Statue of Nelson Mandela, Parliament Square, London, England
- Statue of Nelson Mandela, Union Buildings, Pretoria, South Africa
- Statue of Nelson Mandela (Washington, D.C.), United States
