= Statue of Nelson Mandela, Union Buildings =

Monument in Pretoria, South Africa

Coordinates: 25°44′31″S 28°12′42″E

Nelson Mandela Statue
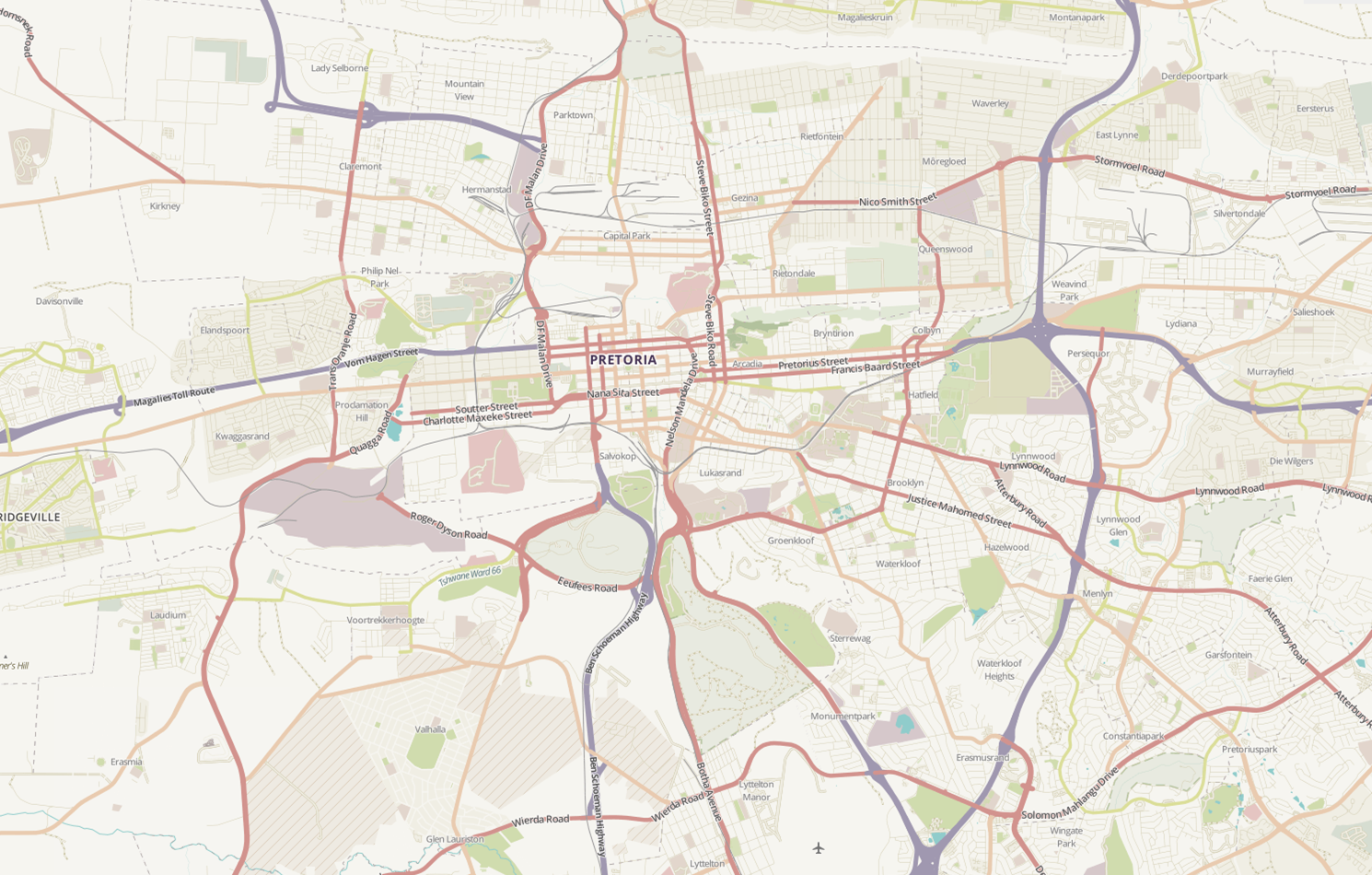
- Artist: Andre Prinsloo and Ruhan Janse van Vuuren
- Year: 2013
- Type: Bronze
- Location: Union Buildings; Pretoria

The Nelson Mandela statue on the Union Buildings grounds, Pretoria, Gauteng, of former President of South Africa and anti-apartheid activist Nelson Mandela, stands 9 metres tall. The statue was unveiled on the Day of Reconciliation (16 December) 2013, bringing the official mourning period of ten days to a close, after Mandela died on 5 December.

== Description ==
The statue, at 9m high, is the tallest figurative statue of Nelson Mandela. It is made in bronze and weighs approximately 3.5 tonnes. From fingertip to fingertip, it measures 8 metres.

The statue was cast in 147 pieces at four different foundries before being assembled in Cape Town, where the engineering work had been done by the Knight brothers at Sculpture Casting Services Foundry. The legs and arms were cast in Nottingham road, KwaZulu-Natal.

=== Inauguration ===
The statue was inaugurated by then President of South Africa Jacob Zuma, who in his speech said:

You will notice that in all the statues that have been made of Madiba, he is raising his fist and at times stretching it. That derives from the slogan of the ANC. This one is different from many. He is stretching out his hands. He is embracing the whole nation. You shouldn’t say this is not Madiba because we know him with his one [raised] hand.

== Location ==
The statue is located in front of the buildings on a spot that used to belong to the statue of J.B.M. Hertzog who was the Prime Minister of South Africa from 1924-1939. Hertzog's statue was taken down on 22 November 2013 and moved to a different location in the grounds.

== Controversy ==
In January 2014 it was discovered that there was a tiny rabbit in the statue's right ear. According to the artists, Andre Prinsloo and Ruhan Janse van Vuuren, they added the bunny in lieu of signing the sculpture, and in remembrance of how quickly they had to produce it. (The Afrikaans word "haas" means both rabbit and "quickly" in English.) After a furore, the artists apologised and the Department of Arts and Culture had the offending bunny removed.

== See also ==
- Free Nelson Mandela (sculpture)
- Statue of Nelson Mandela, Johannesburg
- Statue of Nelson Mandela, Parliament Square
- Statue of Nelson Mandela, Balcony Cape Town City Hall overlooking the Grand Parade
