= Johan de Ridder =

South African architect

- Born: Johannes Andries de Ridder; 21 January 1927; Pretoria, South Africa
- Died: 29 January 2013 (aged 86); Pretoria, South Africa
- Occupation(s): Architect, designer

Johan de Ridder (Pretoria, 21 January 1927 – Pretoria, 29 January 2013) was a South African architect noted for his contribution to religious and public architecture.

Johan de Ridder was the son of Johannes Andries (Dries) de Ridder and Cecile de Ridder.

== Biography ==
Of the major Afrikaner church-architects, including for example Gerard Moerdijk, Wynand Louw, Hendrik Vermooten and J. Anthonie Smith, he designed and built the largest number of churches for the Reformed Churches in South Africa. In terms of public architecture, a prominent contribution is the Land Bank building in Pretoria and the Conservatoire of Music (1960) at North-West University described by Federico Freschi as a "a sculptural tour de force in the Brazilian idiom".

His inspiration, his example and his architecture, still live, Professor Schalk W le Roux (erstwhile Head of the Department of Architecture University of Pretoria) wrote as follows in his obituary: During the second half of the Twentieth Century Johan de Ridder was an influential South African architect. He is best known for a fresh and personal approach to Reformed Church architecture, but this is not the only building type where his example was studied and emulated. It is because he reached beyond the simple requirement of function in his search and design, thus consciously allowing for local realities of climate, terrain, building material, building science and craftsmanship to be realistic and creative generators of structures. The resultant buildings and places celebrated land- and cityscapes with which they were contextually interwoven and expedited the development of a South African way of architectural thought, based on and advocating a contemporary worldview. The same values, fuelled by a love of history, language and country, found expression in restoration work, such as at Paul Kruger’s farm house at Boekenhoutfontein, where he paid tribute to past achievements, and also in houses and bigger buildings, such as the Land Bank building in Pretoria, where again he was true to the present – the time in which he lived and worked. Closest to his heart was possibly the building of churches and his pursuit was for a worthy and meaningful architecture embracing worship. His experimentation to achieve this can be traced in many of his subsequent buildings and designs. As a young architect, he was outspoken about the unchanging and "distinctive style of Gerard Moerdyk and Henry Vermooten" and inspired by the "refreshing modern work of Verhoef Smit and Viljoen who served as inspiration for me." He takes it further when he says: “[My] designs reflect a quest for a new form and aesthetic to express what is essential in a church building.” His striving was for a simplicity in form, line and plane that derives from and reflects the basic nature of worship in the Reformed Church, and its execution within the constraints of available funds. “The function of a church," he said to architecture students in 1955, shortly after the completion of his best known church in Parys, Free State, "is determined by public worship: it is the master builder. The building emerges from a plan and, in its turn, the plan is determined by the function of the building.” In addition, he argued, there was an inherent symbolism and aesthetic in his churches suggesting the Word of God moving from the pulpit, over the congregation and, through the windows, to the world beyond. Referring to the church in Parys he said: "As in many other designs, symbolism, based on biblical truth, is embedded in this structure. It is the symbolism of the church as a tent trekking through the desert of this temporary existence on the journey towards eternity.” The church is therefore a visual symbol of transience with the tent-shape a direct architectural translation of the concept of having no fixed abode. The architect's real contribution is to give form to the symbolic. De Ridder’s three principles, applied to both religious and secular buildings, were firstly that the architecture should be contemporary, secondly that form should emerge from the meaning of the function and thirdly that the structure should be economic and affordable. A faithful adherence to these principles is probably one of the reasons his buildings have withstood the test of time. As an architect, he had the rare experience that his designs remained appreciated and current in his lifetime, and are still being studied and analysed as historically significant in a quest for authenticity. His work was published widely in South Africa and also internationally in both acknowledged academic journals and more popular monthly architectural magazines where his ideas and decisions are revisited and re-evaluated. His inspiration, his example and his architecture live on.

De Ridder's innovative design philosophy is most exemplified in the "Dopper" church, summarised in the New York Museum of Modern Art collection of the photographs of David Goldblatt:

Paradoxically however Dopper churches were architecturally the most radical in the great wave of church building engaged in by the Afrikaner Protestant Churches between the 1940s and the late 1980s. Several of the archetypal Dopper churches, including this one, were by Johan de Ridder. Himself a Dopper, he explained his approach to me in 1994: "The Dopper Church took the lead because of the strength of its doctrine. I could approach the design of the church as the community did, trying to incorporate our beliefs in it. It was not a style. The church was a visual symbol of aspects of our faith, while simultaneously retaining the basic idea of the Reformation that all external symbols should be avoided. I couldn't accept a complicated architecture. I wanted simple wall surfaces, big roof surfaces, a plain, striking building with height and unity between interior and exterior... The triangle is essentially religious with a very vertical and spiritual character. Preaching of the Word is not confined to four walls. It must go out through big windows at the top and front of the church which is like a megaphone with the preacher at its apex."

Excluding the Dutch Reformed church located in Aranos in southern Namibia, all De Ridder's designs were for buildings in the former Transvaal (province) and in the northern Free State (province). In 1986, significant restoration of the Union Buildings was undertaken by Johan de Ridder and T.W. Baker as the appointed architects
