= Ian Walters =

English sculptor (1930–2006)

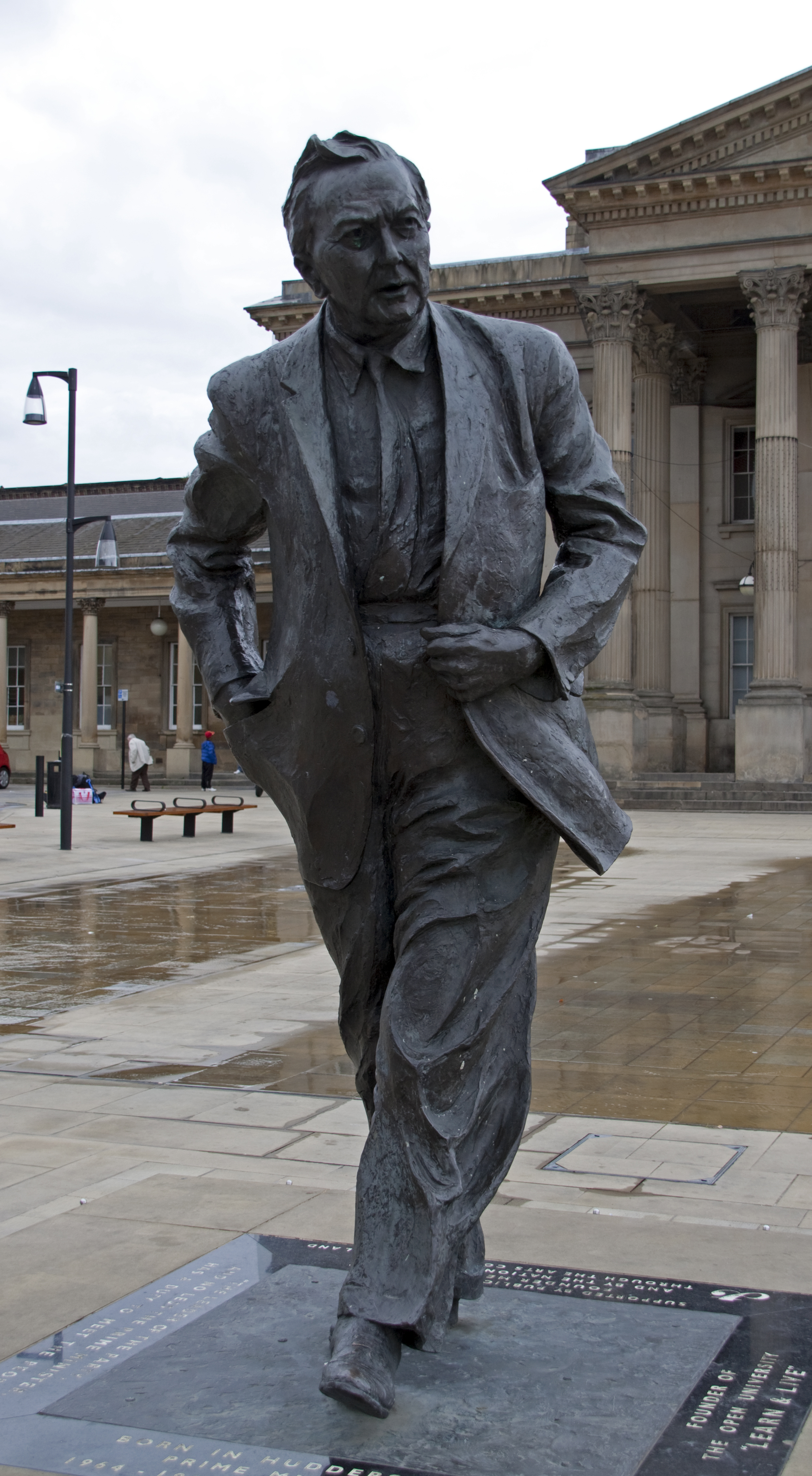
Harold Wilson statue in St George's Square, Huddersfield

Ian Homer Walters (9 April 1930 – 6 August 2006) was an English sculptor.

== Biography ==
Born in Solihull, Walters was educated at Yardley Grammar school and under William Bloye at the Birmingham School of Art. After National Service in the Royal Army Medical Corps he taught sculpture first at Stourbridge College of Art and then from 1957 to 1981 at Guildford School of Art.

A committed socialist from his schooldays, Walters took part in Josip Broz Tito's public sculpture programmes in Yugoslavia in the early 1960s and worked with the African National Congress in the 1970s.

His work includes the memorial to the International Brigades in Jubilee Gardens South Bank, London and a large head of Nelson Mandela (now outside the Royal Festival Hall, London). He had finished the 9-foot-tall (2.7 m) clay sculpture for the statue of Nelson Mandela in Parliament Square, but died of cancer before it was cast in bronze. He also sculpted a statue of Fenner Brockway in London, a statue of Harold Wilson in Huddersfield. A statue of Stephen Hawking at the Centre for Theoretical Cosmology in Cambridge was his last public work.
