= Statue of Nelson Mandela, Cape Town City Hall =

Statue in Cape Town, South Africa

Statue of Nelson Mandela, Balcony Cape Town City Hall overlooking the Grand Parade
- Artist: Xhanti Mpakama and Barry Jackson
- Year: 2018
- Medium: Bronze
- Dimensions: 195 cm (77 in)
- Location: City Hall next to the Grand Parade Cape Town; 33.92535°S 18.42381°E

Location of Cape Town City Hall in central Cape Town

A Statue of Nelson Mandela was unveiled on 24 July 2018. It was placed on the balcony of Cape Town City Hall overlooking the Grand Parade, Cape Town, South Africa. Nelson Mandela was the first post-apartheid president of South Africa and received the Nobel Peace Prize in 1993

== Placing ==
It was placed on exactly the same spot where Nelson Mandela made his first public speech after his release from prison on 11 February 1990.

== Date of unveiling ==
The year was chosen to be part of the celebration of Nelson Mandela's birthday. He would have been 100 years old in 2018 if still alive. He was born on 18 July 1918.

== Initiative ==
It was a joint initiative of The City of Cape Town and the Government of the Western Cape. The reason was to attract more tourists to the region. A public participation exercise was run in order to get input of the people of Cape Town

== Unveiling ==
It was done by Patricia de Lille, Alan Winde and Helen Zille The unveiling was attended by guests from all over the world. It was one of Mrs. de Lille's last official duties as mayor of Cape Town. She was under investigation of her political party and her last day was 31 October 2018. Special guests were Archbishop Emeritus Desmond Tutu and Professor Njabulo Ndebele‚ chairman of the Nelson Mandela Foundation.

== Statute ==
It is a human size statute. It is 1.95m tall. It's a slightly higher than Mandela's actual size (1.85m). It is done in bronze.

== Sculptor ==
Dali Tambo’s company Koketso Growth obtain the tender and commissioned Xhanti Mpakama and Barry Jackson to make the statue. Mpakama's previous work includes Mandela Bust and Shaka. Jackson's prevouis work includes Louis van Mauritius and Johannes van der Kemp

== Legacy exhibition ==
Cape Town City decided that after the unveiling, a legacy exhibition centre will be erected in the City Hall. Audio-visual equipment, with interactive displays, together with interpretive panels will be facilitated in the City Hall. It will include people involved in the struggle for freedom, events that happened just prior to his release and the first democratic election. On 10 December 2021, it was completed and opened by Mayor Geordin Hill-Lewis.

== Other Mandela statues in South Africa ==
- Nelson Mandela Square – The Mandela Statue is in Sandton
- Union Buildings- Mandela Statue in Pretoria
- Nelson Mandela Bay Stadium- in Port Elizabeth
- Leeu House in Franschhoek
- Drakenstein Correctional Services in Paarl

== Controversial temporary removal of statue ==
On 11 January 2019, the day that celebrated the 29th anniversary of Mr Mandela's release, the statue was temporarily removed as a film company was shooting a movie on the parade. Cape Town City Council (under the authority of Mr D Plato, the mayor) gave permission. There was a public outcry about this removal. The statue is back in its place where it was originally commissioned.
