= South African Police Memorial =

Coordinates: 25.741964°S 28.213745°E

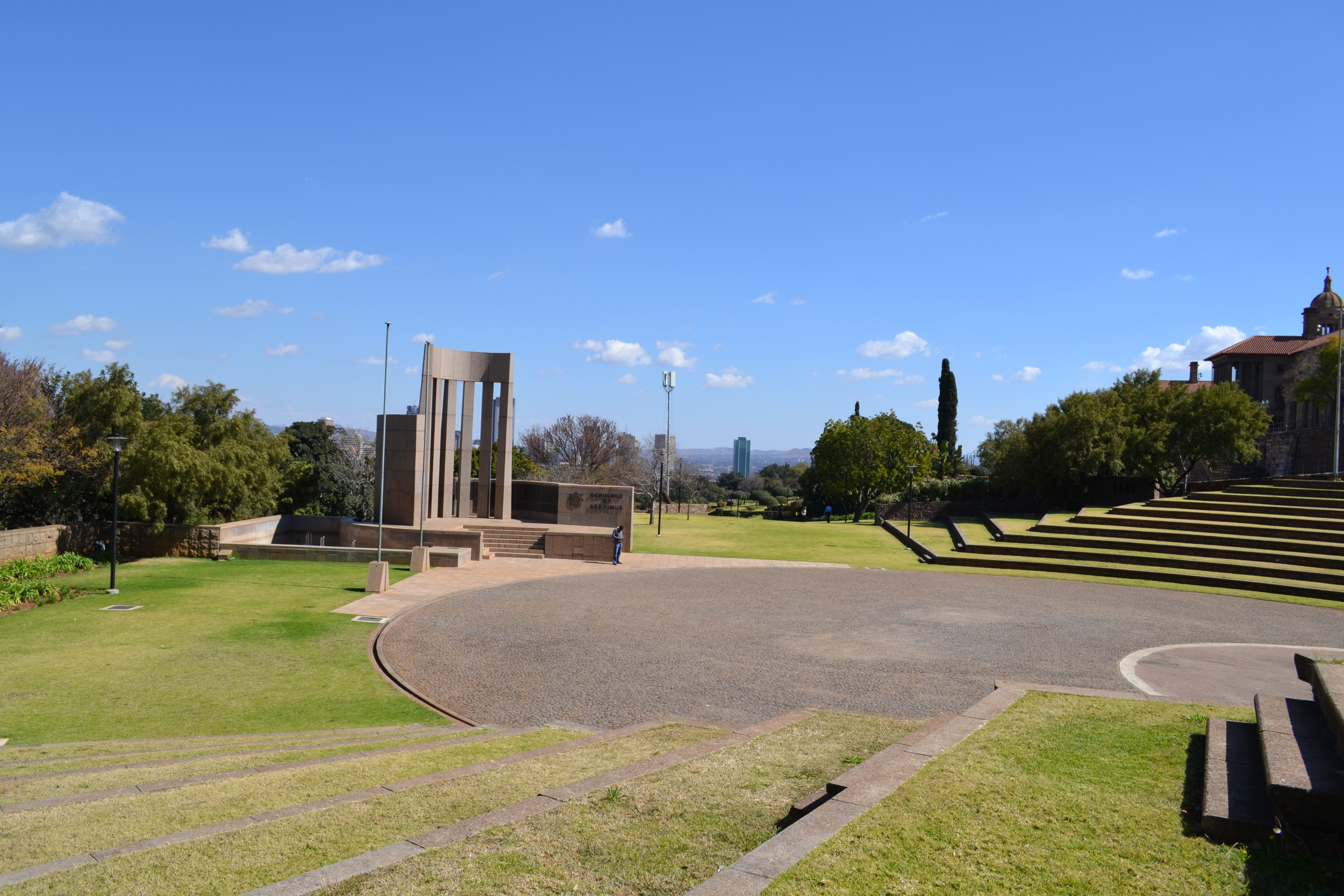
The SAPS Memorial at the Union Buildings in Pretoria.

The South African Police Memorial is located in the grounds of the Union Buildings in Pretoria and commemorates officers of the South African Police Service who died in the line of duty.

== History ==
The memorial was unveiled on 17 October 1984 by State President P.W. Botha. The cornerstone of the memorial was unveiled on 20 May 1983 by the then-Commissioner of the South African Police, General Michiel Christian Wilhelm Geldenhuys. The solid, two-metre-high wall represents the duty of protection by the police, while the seven pillars represent the various branches of service.

The memorial features plates inscribed with the names of the deceased, and it is located across from an amphitheatre that hosts an annual memorial service to commemorate South African police officers killed in the line of duty.

The plaque reads as follows:

ROLL OF HONOUR
ON THIS ROLL OF HONOUR APPEAR THE NAMES OF
THOSE MEMBERS OF THE SOUTH AFRICAN POLICE WHO,
ACCORDING TO AVAILABLE POLICE RECORDS,
DIED IN THE EXECUTION OF THEIR DUTY
FOR SOUTH AFRICA AND ITS PEOPLES.
WE HONOUR THEIR MEMORY.

Plaque above South African Police Memorial

== See also ==
- Cape Police Memorial
