= Union Buildings =

Seat of the South African Government

Coordinates: 25°44′25.68″S 28°12′43.28″E

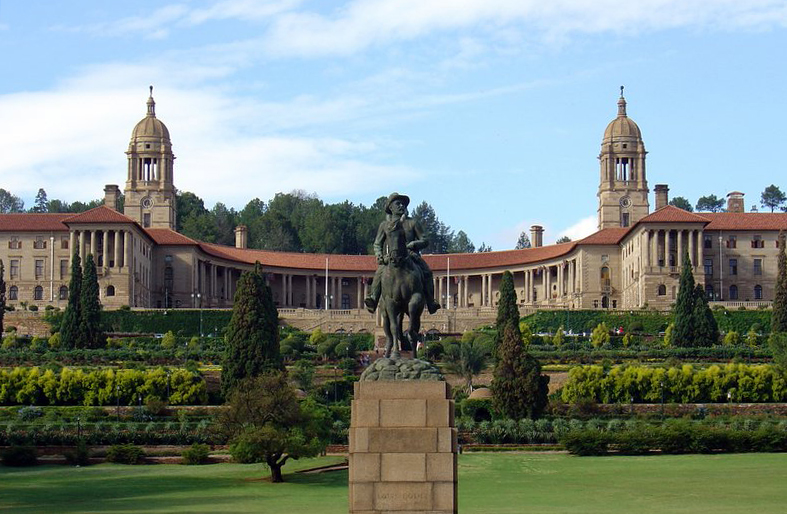
- The Union Buildings viewed from the Gardens, in the foreground is the equestrian statue of General Louis Botha.

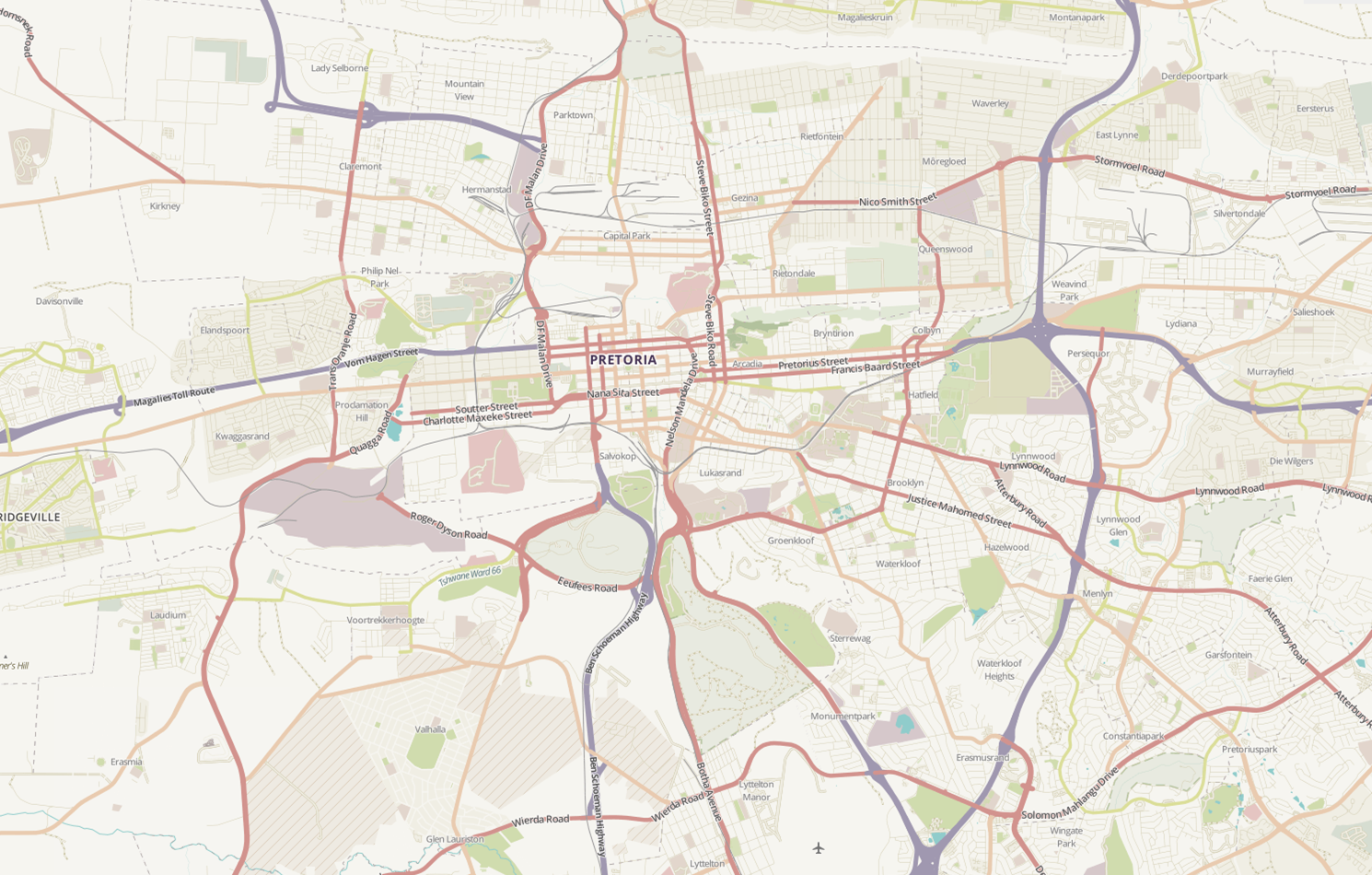
- Location within Pretoria Location within Gauteng Location within South Africa Location within Africa

General information
- Architectural style: Neoclassicism of Italian Renaissance, with Cape Dutch and Edwardian style detail.
- Location: Meintjieskop, Arcadia, Pretoria, South Africa
- Construction started: 1 November 1910; 116 years ago
- Completed: 1913; 113 years ago
- Client: South Africa

Technical details
- Size: 285m (length) 100m (width) 60m (height)

Design and construction
- Architect: Sir Herbert Baker

UNESCO World Heritage Site
- Official name: Human Rights, Liberation and Reconciliation: Nelson Mandela Legacy Sites
- Designated: 2024 (46th session)
- Reference no.: 1676

The Union Buildings (Afrikaans: Uniegebou) form the official seat of the South African Government and also house the offices of the President of South Africa. The imposing buildings are located in Pretoria, atop Meintjeskop at the northern end of Arcadia, close to historic Church Square. The large gardens of the Buildings are nestled between Government Avenue, Vermeulen Street East, Church Street, the R104 and Blackwood Street. Fairview Avenue is a closed road through which only officials can enter the Union Buildings. Though not in the centre of Pretoria, the Union Buildings occupy the highest point of Pretoria, and constitute a South African national heritage site.

The Buildings are one of the centres of political life in South Africa; "The Buildings" and "Arcadia" have become metonyms for the South African government. It has become an iconic landmark of Pretoria and South Africa in general, and is one of the most popular tourist attractions in the city and an emblem of democracy.

The Buildings are the location of presidential inaugurations.

== Architecture ==
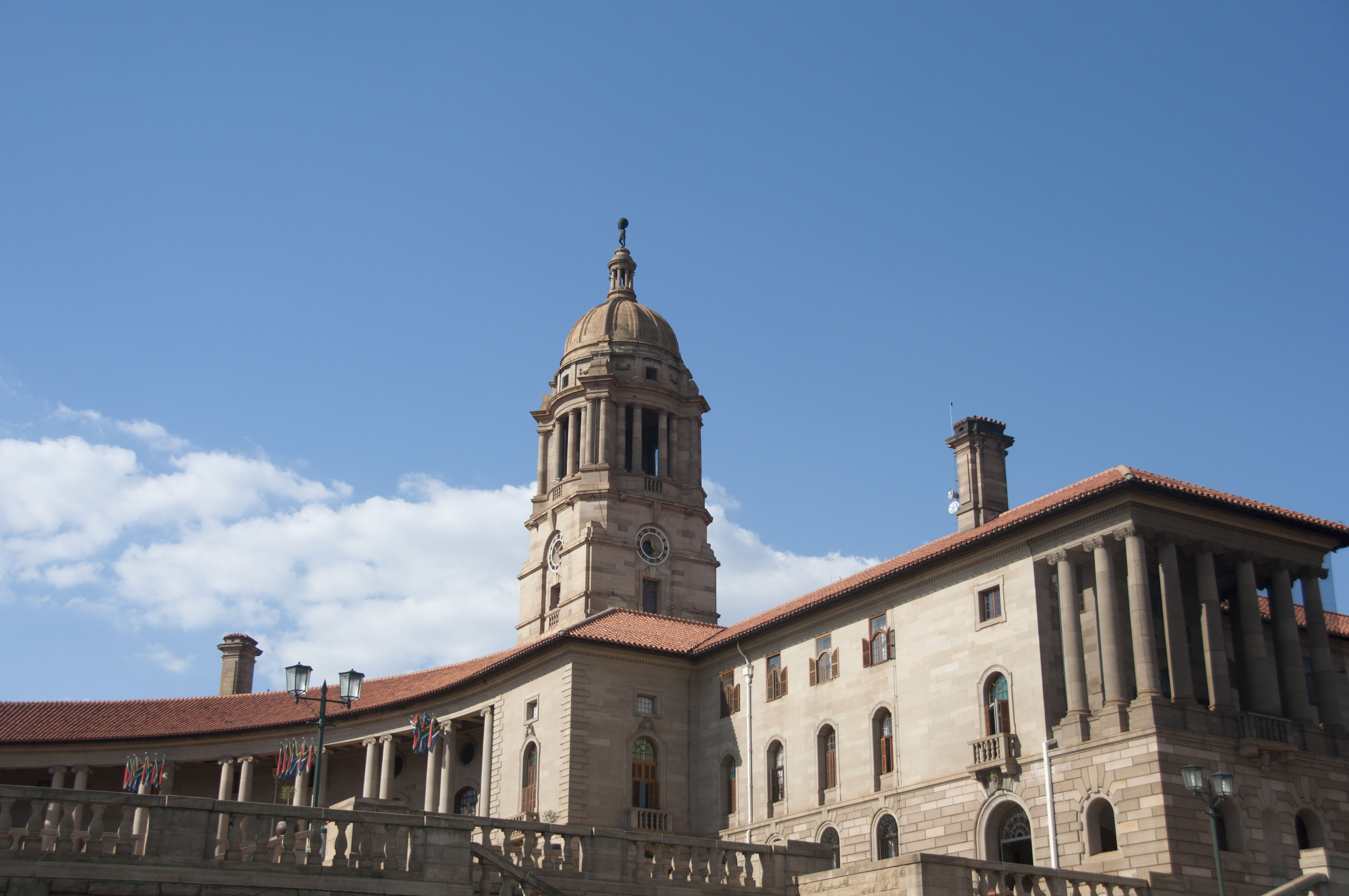
The eastern wing of The Union Buildings represents the English population of South Africa

These buildings, built from light sandstone, were designed by the architect Sir Herbert Baker in the English monumental style and are 285 m long. They have a semi-circular colonnade at the middle, and the two wings at the sides, this serves to represent the union of a formerly divided people. The clock chimes are identical to those of Big Ben in London. The east and west wings, as well as the twin-domed towers, represent two languages, English and Afrikaans, and the inner court was designed and built to symbolise the Union of South Africa. These buildings are considered by many to be the architect's greatest achievement and a South African architectural masterpiece. The Nelson Mandela statue in Sandton City's Nelson Mandela Square was commissioned originally to stand on the spot where Nelson Mandela gave his inaugural address.

The building was sited on a disused quarry, which now makes up the amphitheatre. The matching statues on top of the domed towers are Atlas, holding up the world, sculpted by Abraham Broadbent. The statue on the domed rostrum in the amphitheatre between the wings is Mercury, a mythic Roman messenger and a god of trade, sculpted by George Ness. The closest suburb to the Union Buildings is Arcadia, which is named after the classical idealisation of the ancient Greek region of the same name . Pretoria has the second largest number of embassies in the world, after Washington, D.C., most of which are located in or near Arcadia.

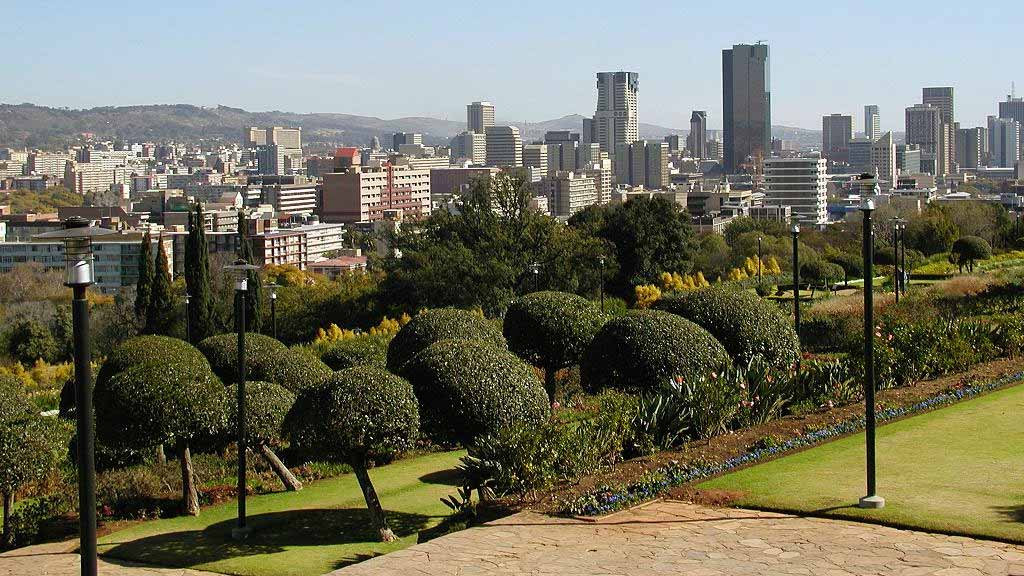
View from the gardens

The design of each level differs, and therefore each stone had to be individually cut. The Architectural styles of the building ranges from the lower levels' Edwardian style to the top levels' Cape Dutch design with shutters on the windows. The windows from bottom to top are elongated and become shorter towards the top floor. This is to give the illusion of height.

The Union Buildings are the site of presidential inaugurations. The official offices of the president are on the left-hand side of the Union Buildings, and the South African national flag is flown on the left-hand side if the president is in office.

The Buildings are divided into three sections; the left offices, amphitheatre, and right offices. All are 95 metres in length. Each office block contains three inner courtyards providing light and air to the offices. Each block has a basement and three floors above ground. The central curved building behind the colonnade houses the committee rooms, a library and conference rooms while the basement contains the kitchen, dining rooms and lounges.

The interior is treated in the Cape Dutch style: carved teak fanlights, heavy doors, dark ceiling beams contrasting with white plaster walls and heavy wood furniture.

== History ==
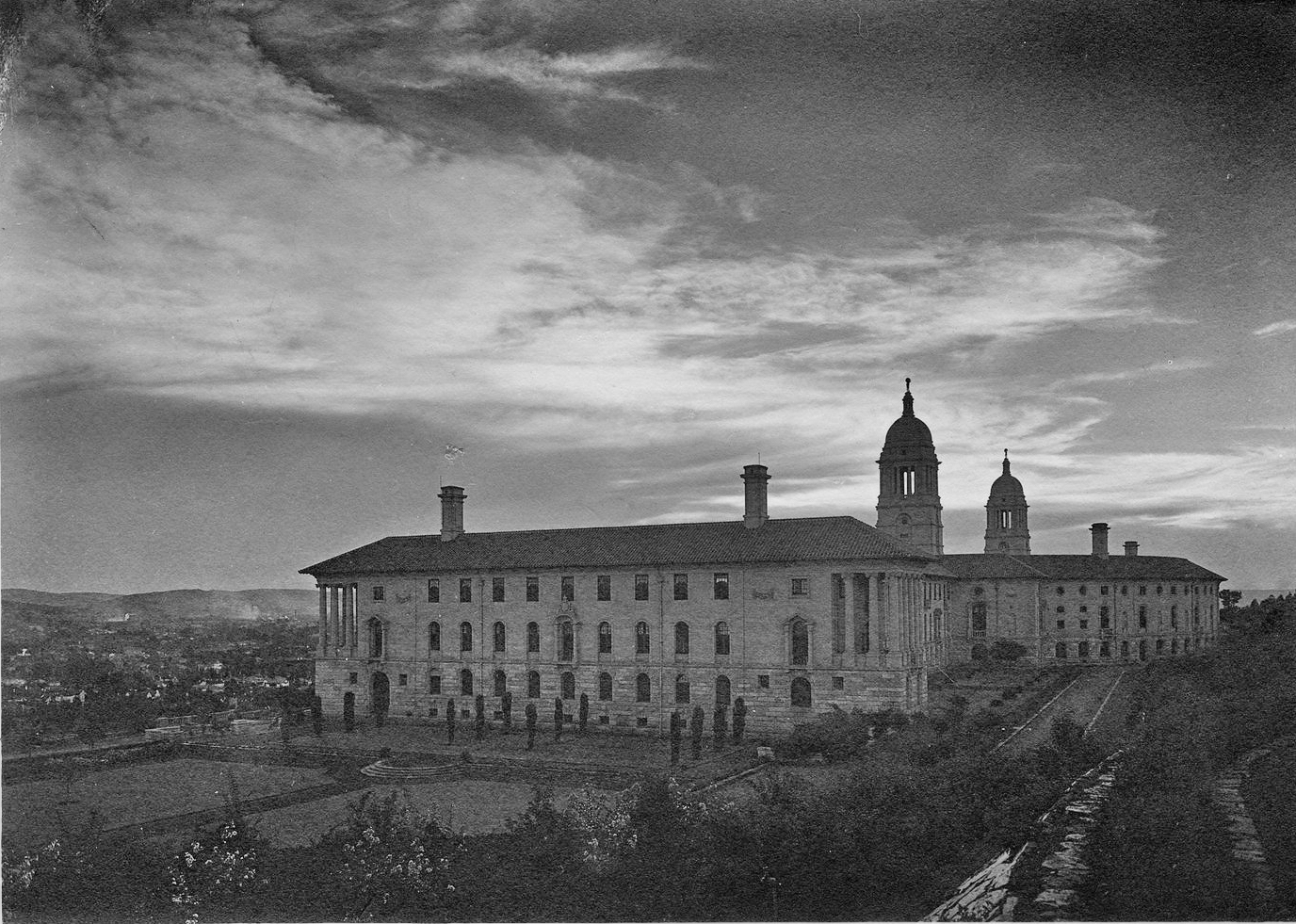
Circa 1925

The Boer Republics of the ZAR and the Orange Free State were united with the Cape Colony and Natal Colony in 1910 to become the Union of South Africa. Pretoria then became the administrative capital of the whole of South Africa, with Cape Town the legislative capital. Between 1860 and 1994, the city was also the capital of the province of Transvaal, superseding Potchefstroom in that role. The new Union required a governmental building which could signify unity and host the new government.

Marthinus Wessel Pretorius, later to become first president of the Transvaal Republic, was the original owner of the farm 'Elandsfontein' on which Meintjieskop stands. In 1856 Andries Francois du Toit (1813–1883), in exchange for a Basotho pony, acquired part of the farm, which he named 'Arcadia' and on which the Union Buildings were later constructed. He was also Pretoria's first magistrate and was responsible for the layout of the city. During this period he sold his land to Stephanus Jacobus Meintjies (1819–1887), after whom the hill is named.

In 1909 Herbert Baker was commissioned to design the Government Building of the Union of South Africa (which was formed on 31 May 1910) in Pretoria. Pretoria was to become the administrative centre for the new government. In November 1910 the cornerstone of the Union Buildings was laid.

Lord Selborne and Henry Charles Hull, a member of the first Union Cabinet, chose Meintjieskop as the site for Baker's design. The site was that of a disused quarry and the existing excavations were used to create the amphitheatre, which was set about with ornamental pools, fountains, sculptures, balustrades, and trees.

The design consisted of two identical wings, joined by a semi-circular colonnade forming the backdrop of the amphitheatre. The colonnade was terminated on either side by a tower. Each wing had a basement and three floors above ground. The interiors were created in the Cape Dutch style with carved teak fanlights, heavy doors, dark ceiling beams contrasting with white plaster walls and heavy wood furniture. Baker used indigenous materials as far as possible. The granite was quarried on site while Buiskop sandstone was used for the courtyards. Stinkwood and Rhodesian teak were used for timber and wood panelling. The roof tiles and quarry tiles for the floors were made in Vereeniging.

The cornerstone was laid in November 1910, shortly after the Union of South Africa – for which the buildings are named – was formed. Taking 1,265 workers over three years to build, the structure was completed in 1913 at a total cost of £1,310,640 for the building and £350,000 for the site.

Designed by Sir Herbert Baker in 1908, building began in 1909 and was completed in 1913. It took approximately 1,265 artisans, workmen and labourers almost three years to construct, using 14 million bricks for the interior office walls, 5,000,000 cubic feet (140,000 m^{3}) of freestone, 74,000 cubic yards (57,000 m^{3}) of concrete, 40 000 bags of cement and 20,000 cubic feet (570 m^{3}) of granite.

Originally built to house the entire Public Service for the Union of South Africa, it was then the largest building in the country and possibly the largest building work undertaken in the Southern Hemisphere at that time.

Several other sites were considered, including Muckleneuk Ridge, on the opposite side of the city, and Pretorius Square, in the centre of Pretoria, where the City Hall now stands. However, Herbert Baker was strongly in favour of Meintjieskop, which was within 1.6 kilometres of the centre of Pretoria and reminded him strongly of some of the acropolises of Greece and Asia Minor, where he had studied Mediterranean architecture.

The concept of an acropolis and a building that agreed with renowned British Architect Sir Christopher Wren's theory that a public building should be a national ornament which establishes a nation, draws people and commerce and makes people love their country easily persuaded the then powers that be, who were at the time, preoccupied with the ideal of establishing a new and united nation.

The British high commissioner at the time, Lord Selborne, remarked;

People will come from all over the world to wonder at the beauty of the site and to admire the forethought and courage of the men who selected it.

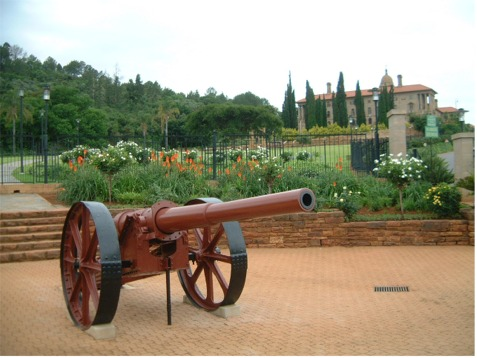
Historic naval gun outside the buildings

The design of the buildings was largely determined by the nature of the site. Baker envisaged identical wings of rectangular office blocks, each representing one of the two official languages. They were to be linked by a semicircular wing, and the space in-between the two wings was levelled to form an amphitheatre as in the Greek fashion for gatherings of national and ceremonial importance.

Baker wanted the buildings to be built of imported granite, but any idea of using anything but South African stone for the most important government building of the new state was unthinkable to those who commissioned it, as a result, the terraces and retaining walls in the grounds are built predominantly of mountain stone quarried on site, the foundation of the building is of granite, while freestone was used for the exterior walls, the amphitheatre and major courtyards.

For the overall design of the building, Baker chose the neo-classic architecture of the Italian Renaissance, and also combined an idiom of the English Renaissance, as well as significant elements of Cape Dutch detail, such as in the carved main doorways and fanlights and in much of the wrought-iron brass work and balustrades of the smaller areas.

=== Historical events ===
On 9 August 1956, 20,000 women marched to the doors of the Union Buildings, chanting "Wathint' Abafazi, wathint' imbokodo!" which means "Strike the women, strike the rock!" to protest against the pass laws of 1950. This historical event is commemorated by the public holiday National Women's Day.

Wilma Cruise and Marcus Holmes were approached to design a memorial to commemorate the Women's March. They made use of the imbokodo, a millstone used by women to grind maize. Cruise and Holmes rested the imbokodo, representing nurture and sustenance, on bronze plates, representing the earth and fire. There are two sets of stairs leading to the memorial, and on each step in raised bronze letters are the words from "The Demand of the Women of South Africa for the Withdrawal of Passes for Women and Repeal of the Pass Laws." On approaching the imbokodo, visitors trigger infrared beams, which activate history's "whispered voices", echoed in all 11 official languages, the rally cry repeated softly.

In 1986, significant restoration of the Union Buildings was undertaken by Johan de Ridder and T.W. Baker as the appointed architects.

On 10 May 1994, the inauguration of Nelson Mandela, South Africa's first democratically elected president after the end of Apartheid, and his vice-presidents, heralded the beginning of a new era in South Africa's history.

Part of Nelson Mandela's inaugural address:

"Today, all of us do, by our presence here, and by our celebrations in other parts of our country and the world, confer glory and hope to newborn liberty.

Out of the experience of an extraordinary human disaster that lasted too long, must be born a society of which all humanity will be proud.

Our daily deeds as ordinary South Africans must produce an actual South African reality that will reinforce humanity's belief in justice, strengthen its confidence in the nobility of the human soul and sustain all our hopes for a glorious life for all.

All this we owe both to ourselves and to the peoples of the world who are so well represented here today. ....... We understand it still that there is no easy road to freedom.

We know it well that none of us acting alone can achieve success.

We must therefore act together as a united people, for national reconciliation, for nation building, for the birth of a new world.

Let there be justice for all.

Let there be peace for all.

Let there be work, bread, water and salt for all.

Let each know that for each the body, the mind and the soul have been freed to fulfill themselves.

Never, never and never again shall it be that this beautiful land will again experience the oppression of one by another and suffer the indignity of being the skunk of the world.

Let freedom reign.

The sun shall never set on so glorious a human achievement!

Let us as a Rainbow nation keep this in focus and move forward!"

On 31 December 1999 the South African flagship Millennium celebration was held here. In attendance was the then deputy president Jacob Zuma, and other ministers.

On 10 December 2013, the Union Buildings Amphitheatre was renamed the Nelson Mandela Amphitheatre.

On 16 December 2013, a 9-metre high bronze statue of Mandela was unveiled at the Union Buildings.

== Gardens and grounds ==
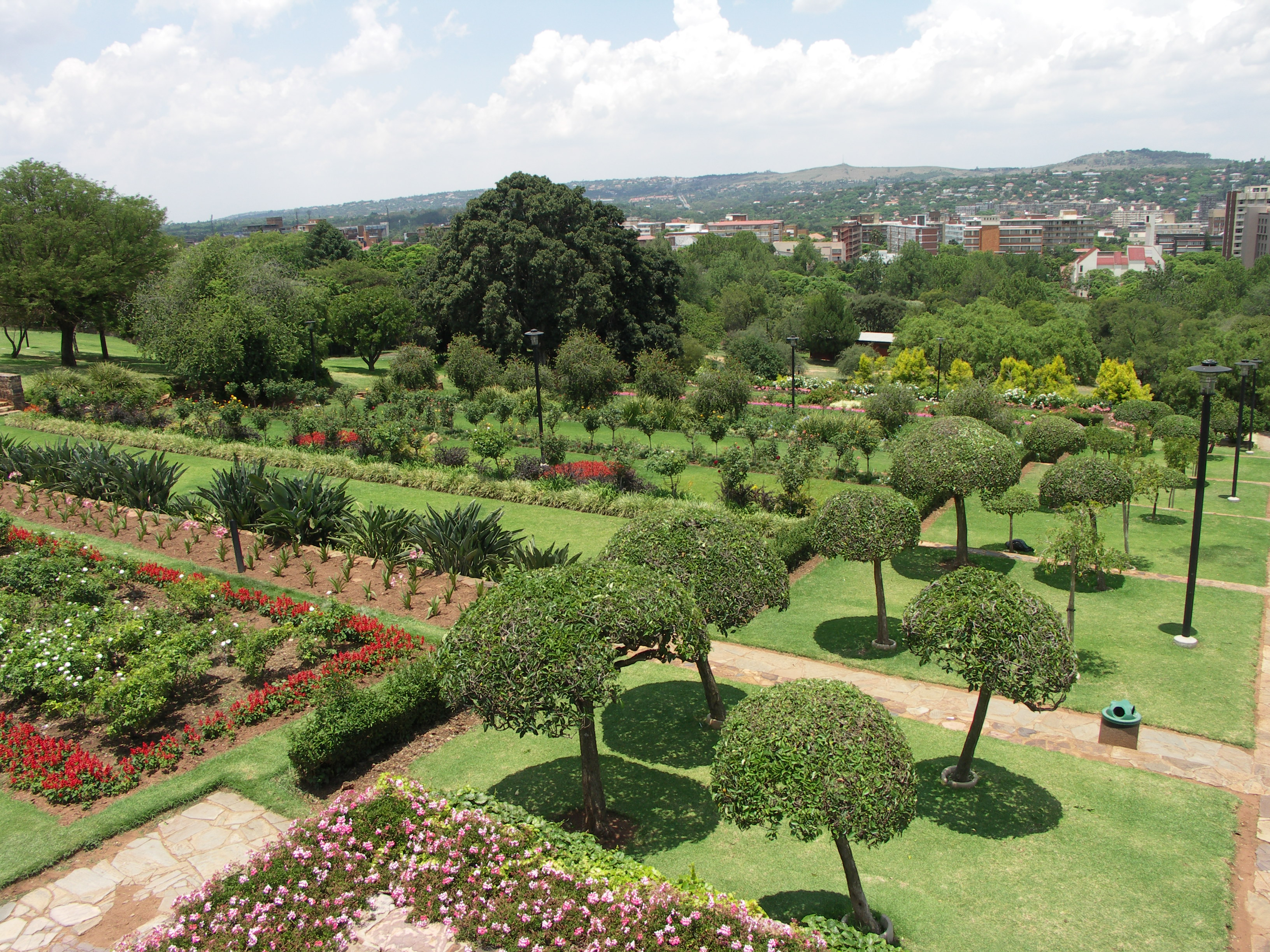
The terraced gardens

The building is surrounded by beautifully terraced gardens of indigenous plants. Various monuments adorn the expansive lawns, including the Delville Wood War Memorial and a statue of the country's first Prime Minister, General The Rt Hon. Louis Botha. The lawn in front of the Union Buildings is often the location for public gatherings, whether they be protest or celebration, such as the presidential inauguration.

Notable are the terraced gardens, planted exclusively with indigenous plants, surrounding the buildings as well as the 9,000 seat Nelson Mandela amphitheatre.

=== Statues and memorials ===
Within the grounds are various monuments, statues and memorials. Starting at the bottom of the gardens, a large statue of General Louis Botha (first prime minister of the Union of South Africa) on horseback dominates the lawn. About halfway up the terraces, the Delville Wood War Memorial is a tribute to South African troops who died during the First World War as well as a plaque in memory of those that died during the Korean War.

Two levels above that is a statue of President Nelson Mandela. This replaced the statue of General J.B.M. Hertzog, a former Prime Minister, which can still be found on the grounds.

The South African Police Memorial is located at the top right of the gardens.

The South African National Film, Video and Sound Archives is also located in the grounds of the Union Buildings, adjacent to the Police Memorial.

== Laws governing the buildings ==
Because of the significance of the Voortrekker Monument and the Union Buildings in the national consciousness, a law in Pretoria limits the height of any building between the Voortrekker Monument and the Union Buildings such that the view between them remains unobstructed.

== Powers and duties ==
The Union Buildings share duties with Cape Town as the seat of the South African Government. Pretoria shares duties with Cape Town and Bloemfontein as the capital cities of South Africa.

The official seats of the President are the Union Buildings in Pretoria and the Tuynhuys in Cape Town.

== Gallery ==
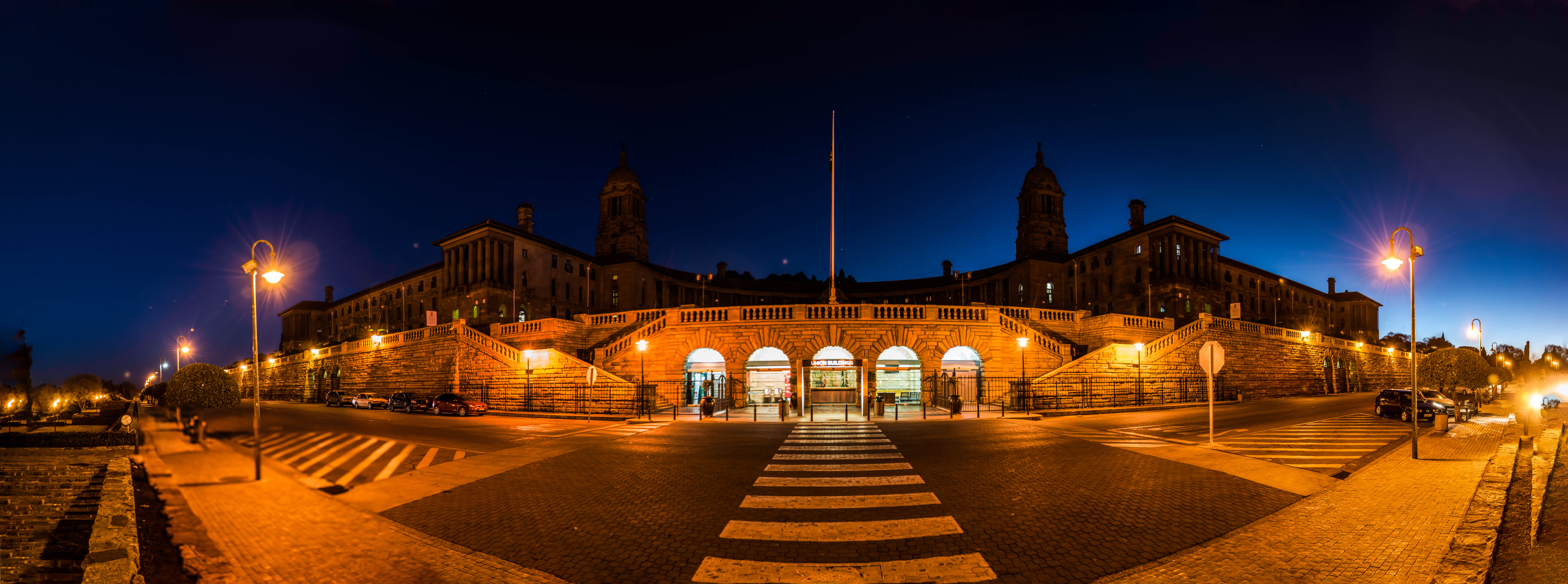
The Union Buildings at Sunrise
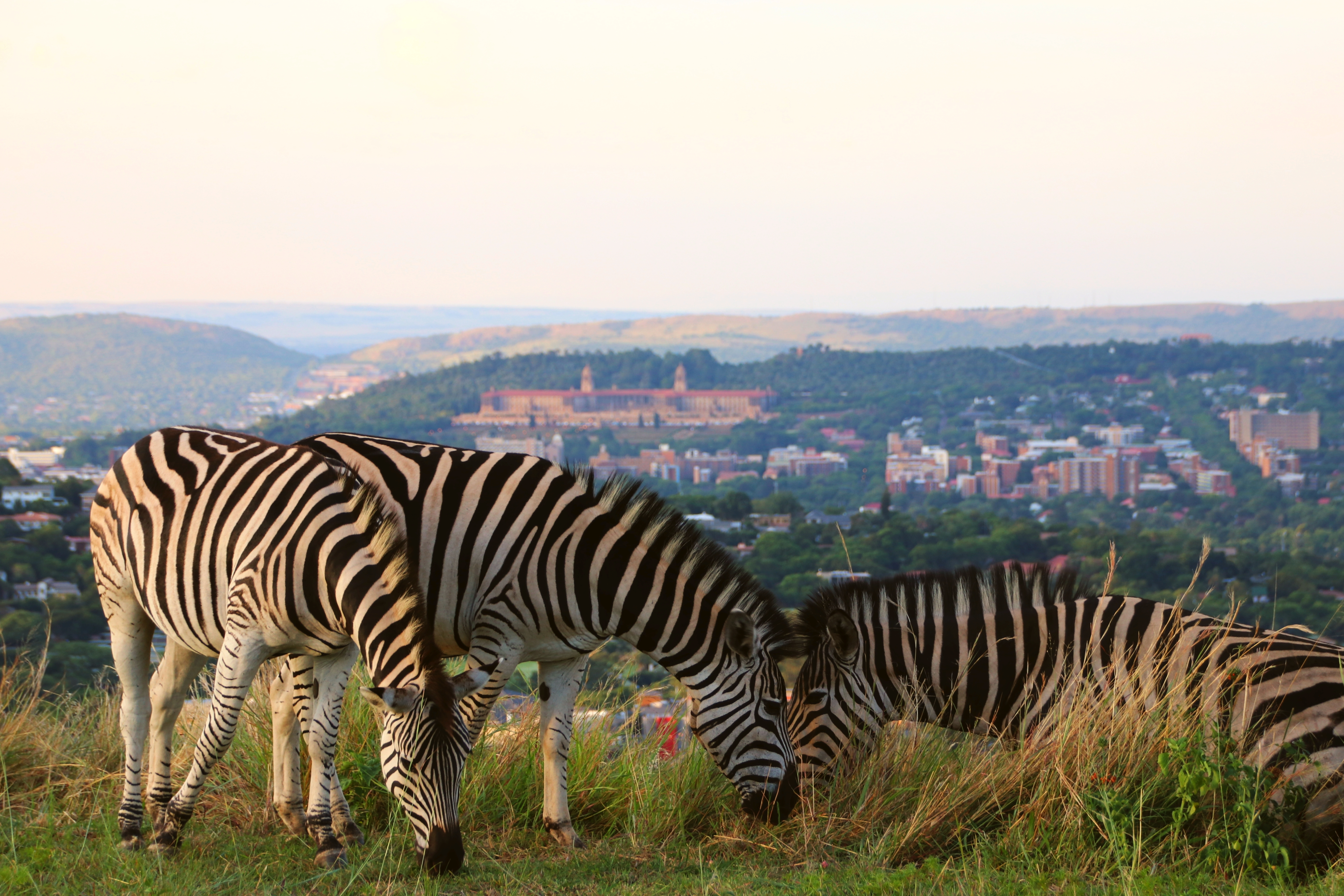
Zebras in Pretoria with Union Buildings seen in the background.

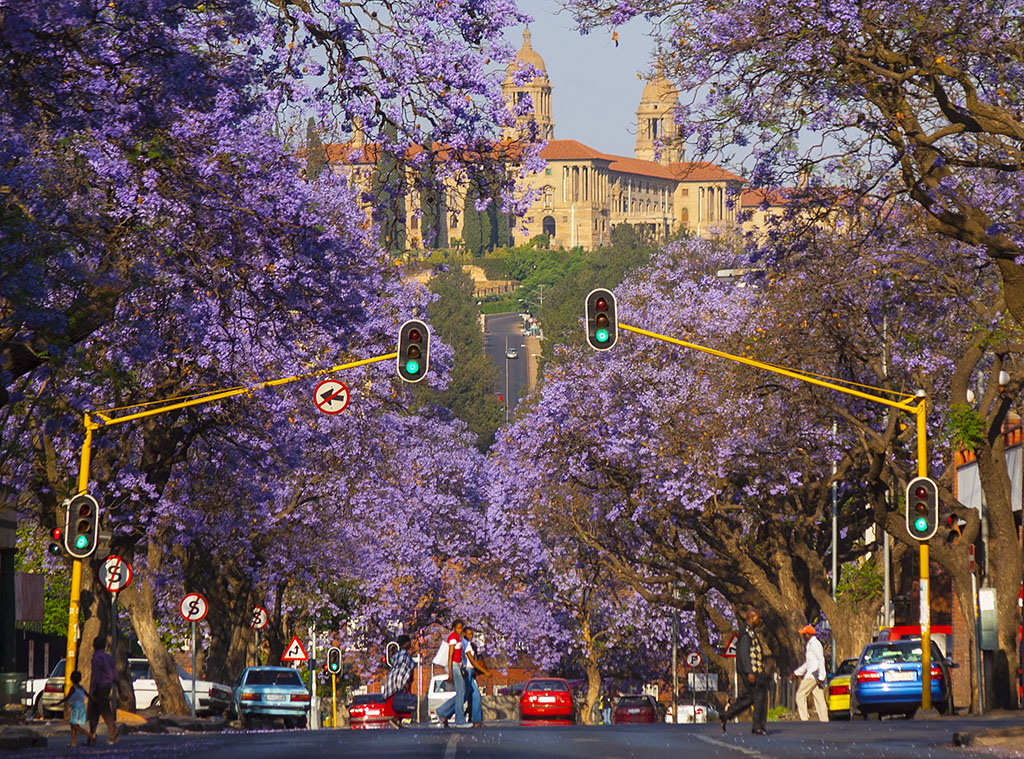
Jacaranda trees in Pretoria which covers Pretoria in a purple blanket during October.

== See also ==
- Pretoria
- Sir Herbert Baker
- Houses of Parliament, Cape Town
- Supreme Court of Appeal of South Africa
- Rashtrapati Bhavan
