= Meintjieskop =

Hill in Pretoria

Coordinates: 25°44′18″S 28°12′36″E

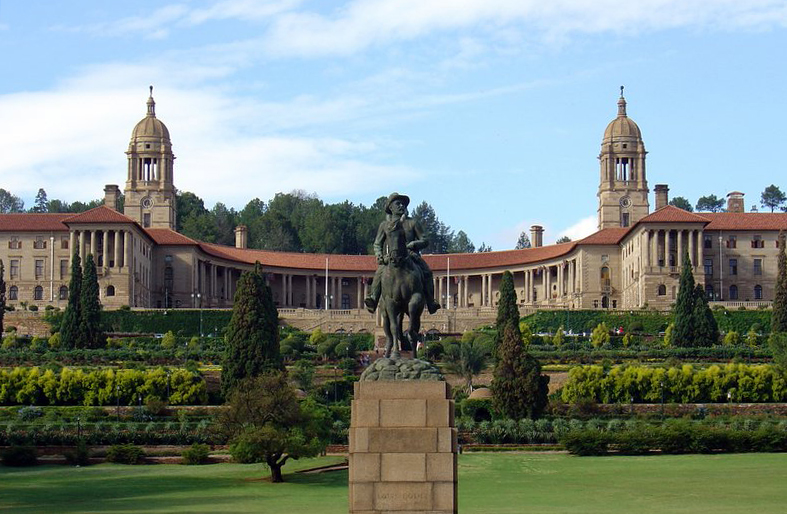

Highest point

Geography

Meintjeskop is a hill in Pretoria on which the Union Buildings (die Uniegebou(e) in Afrikaans) were constructed.

Marthinus Wessel Pretorius, later to become first president of the Transvaal Republic, was the original owner of the farm 'Elandsfontein' on which Meintjeskop stands. In 1856 Andries Francois du Toit (1813–1883), in exchange for a Basuto pony, acquired part of the farm, which he named Arcadia. He was also Pretoria’s first magistrate and was responsible for planning the layout of the city. During this period he sold his land for £1200 to Stephanus Jacobus Meintjes (1819–1887), and by 1870 it bore the name Meintjeskop.

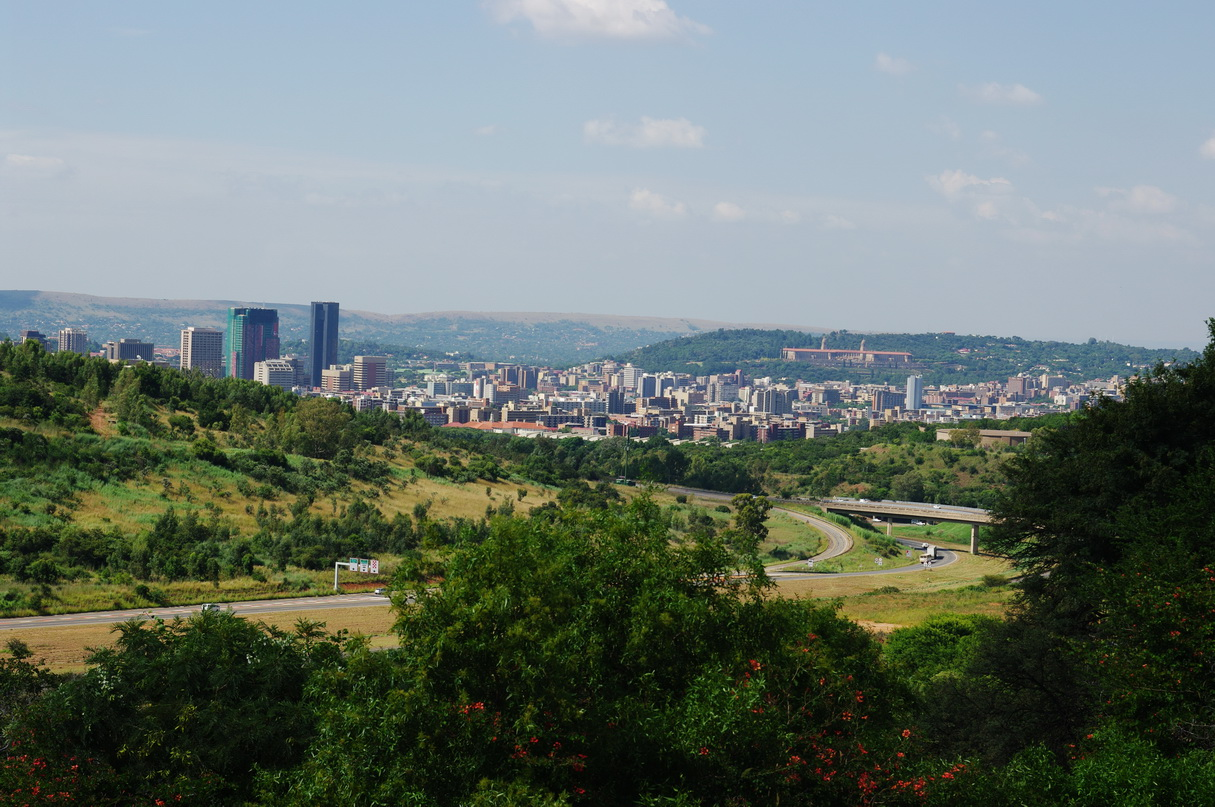
Meintjieskop in the distance

Meintjeskop is part of Magliesberg range, which runs east–west through Pretoria. Geologically it forms part of the Pretoria Group of the Transvaal Basin.
