= Sandton City =

Shopping mall in Sandton, Gauteng, South Africa

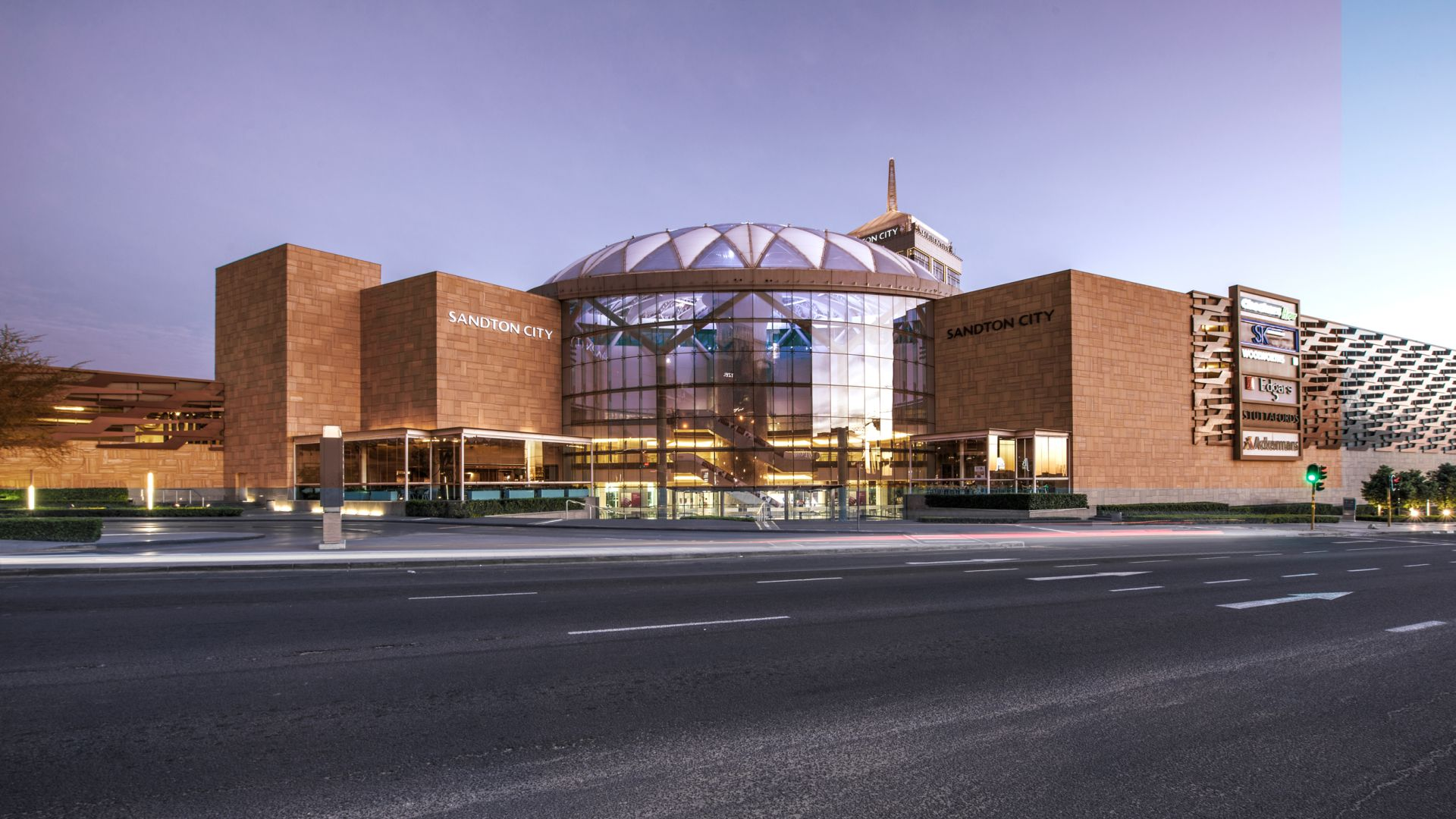
- Sandton City entrance on Rivonia Road
- Location: Sandton, Gauteng, South Africa
- Coordinates: 26°06′30″S 28°03′15″E
- Opened: 12 September 1973; 53 years ago
- Developer: Rapp and Maister
- Owner: Liberty Holdings Limited/Liberty Two Degrees; Pareto Ltd
- Num. of stores: 300+
- Floor area: 128,000 square metres (1,380,000 sq ft)
- Parking: 10 000
- Website: sandtoncity.co.za

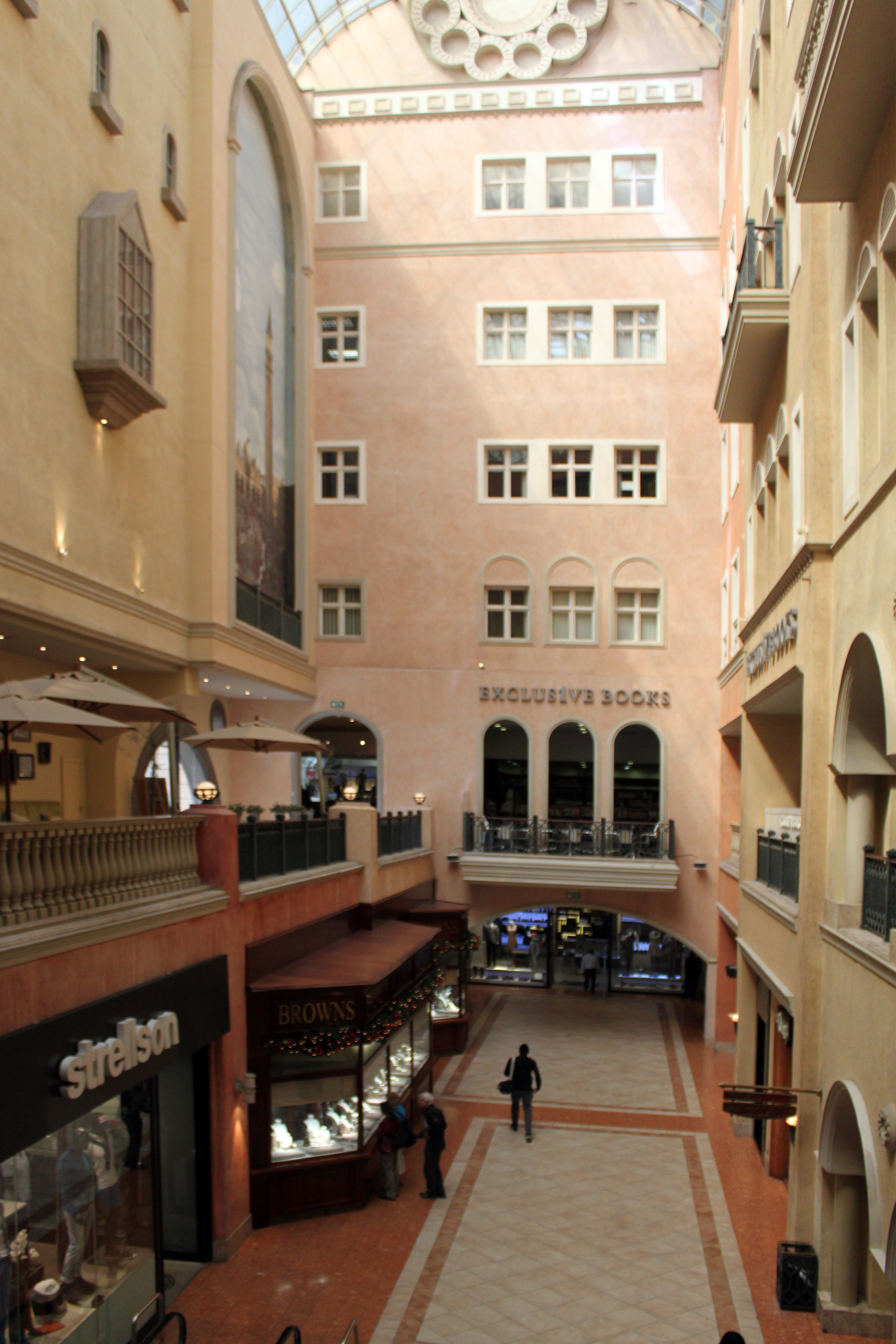
The complex interior in 2014

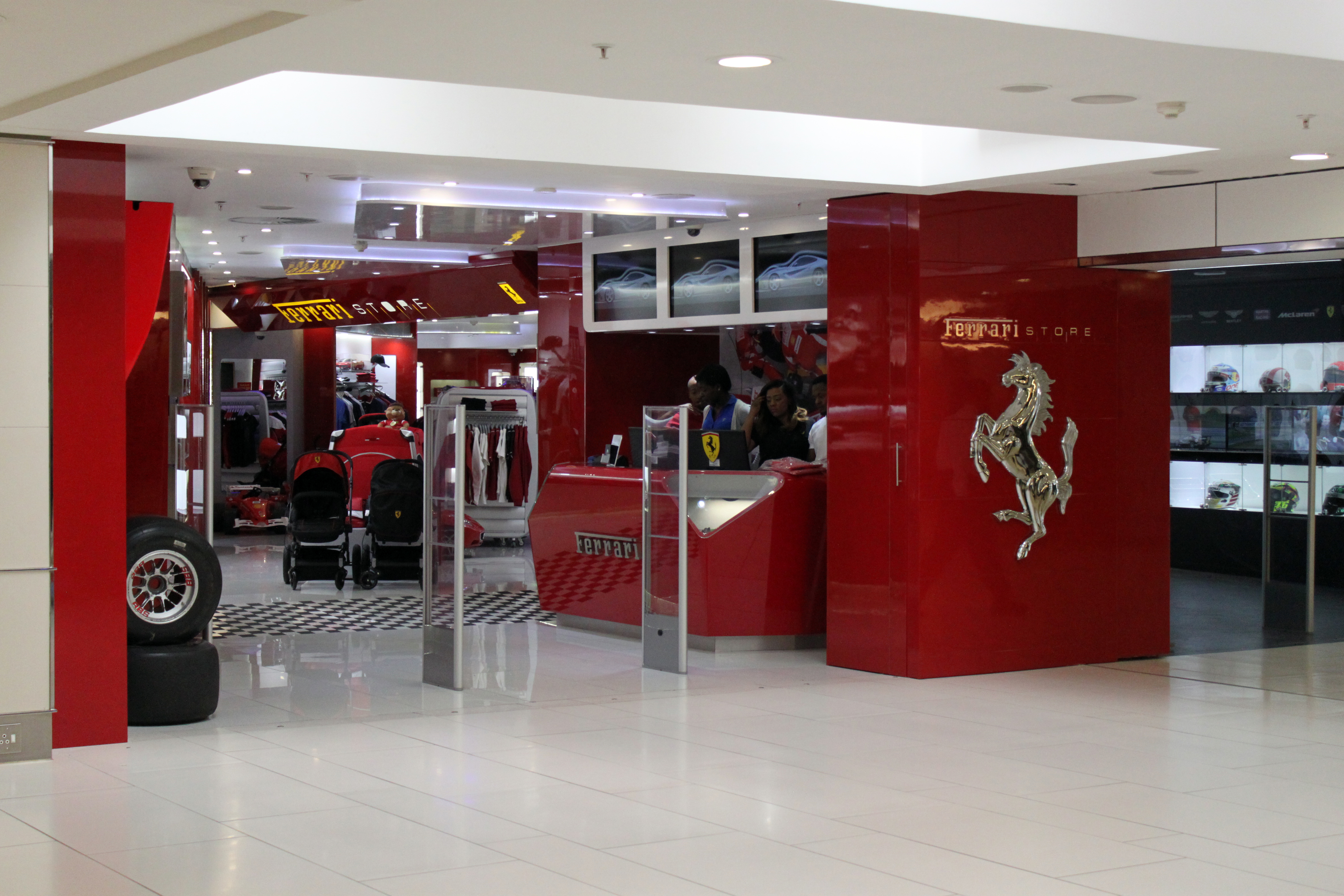
The Ferrari outlet in 2014

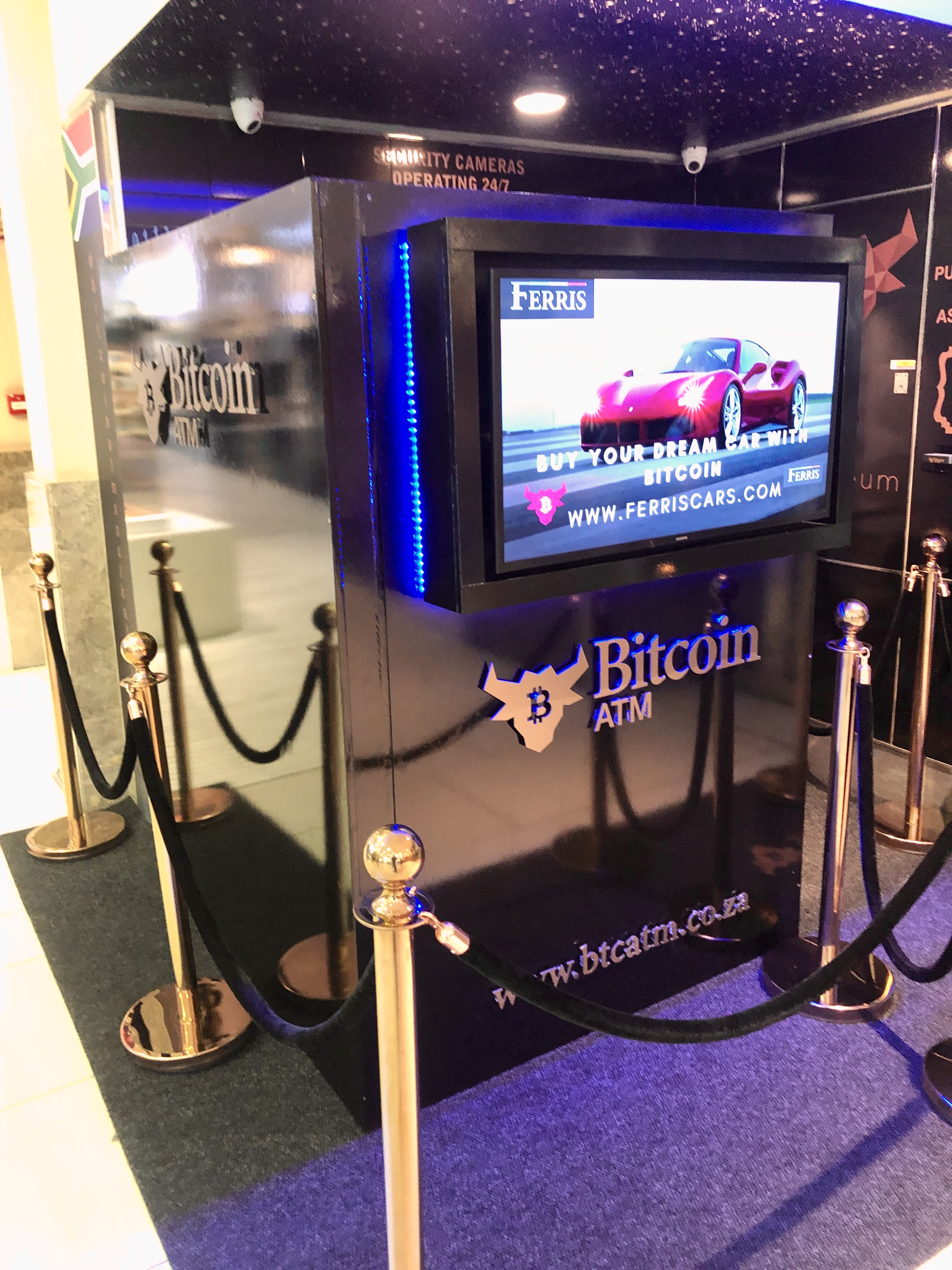
A Bitcoin cryptocurrency ATM in 2021

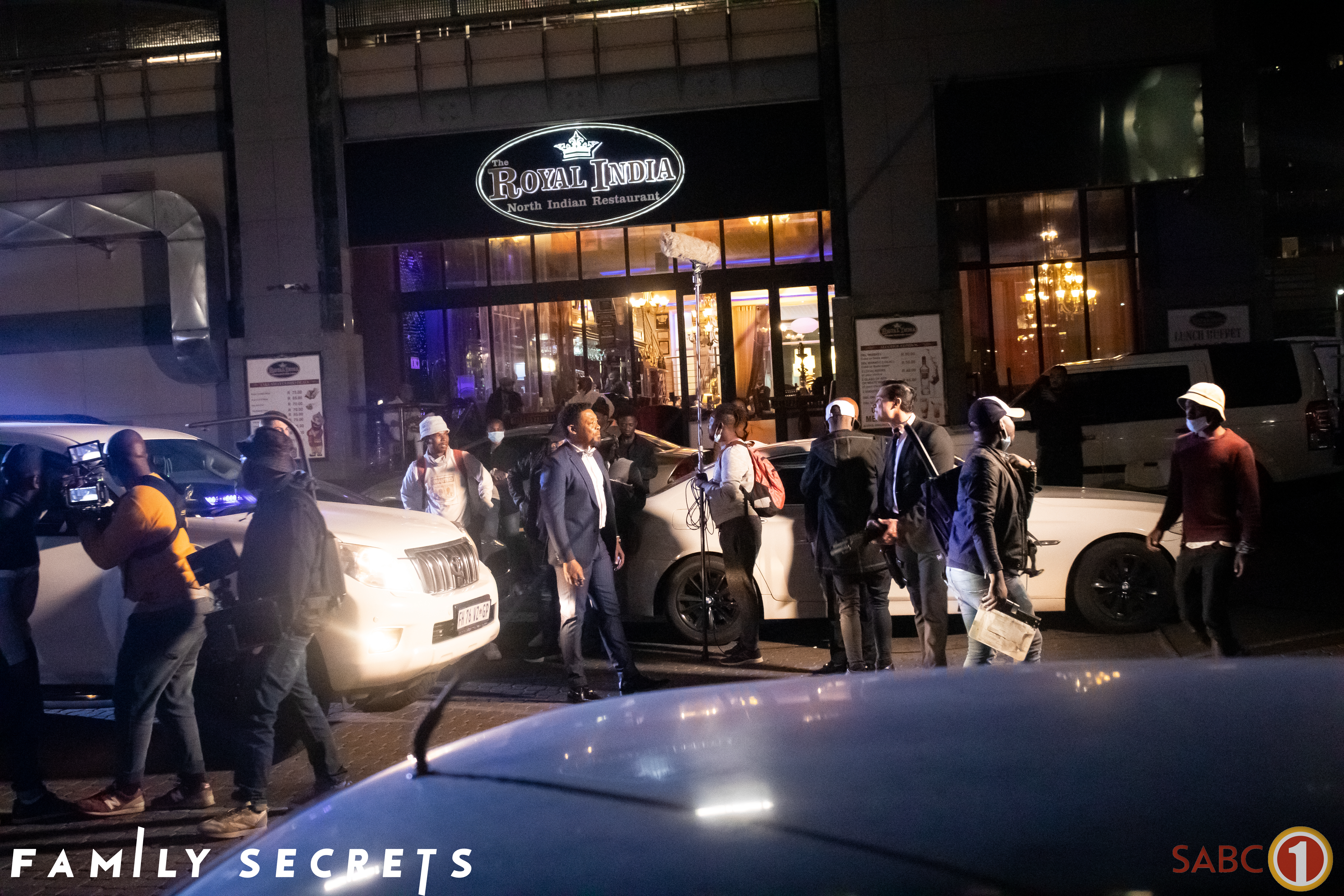
A television production for series Family Secrets at the Royal India restaurant in 2021

Sandton City is a large shopping centre situated in Sandton, Gauteng, South Africa. It was built and owned by property development company Rapp and Maister, in partnership with brothers Hilliard and Eli Leibowitz, and was later taken over by Liberty Life (now part of Liberty Holdings Limited).

The centre opened to the public on 12 September 1973 and has a gross leasable area of 128,000 m^{2} (1,380,000 sq ft) of retail space. The office space combined with the Sandton Sun Hotel increase the total area to 215,000 m^{2} (2,310,000 sq ft). Together, Sandton City and the adjacent Nelson Mandela Square (formerly Sandton Square) form one of the largest retail complexes in Africa with shops such as Louis Vuitton, Gucci, Prada, Patek Phillipe, Dolce & Gabbana and other exclusive boutiques - sometimes referred to as "the richest square mile in Africa".

== History ==
Sandton City was built as a twenty-one storey, concrete block shopping centre that opened in late 1973. It is an example of the Brutalist architecture that was common in South Africa in the early 1970s. The architecture is also seen in the Golden Acre (Goue Akker), a similar shopping centre built in Cape Town before the construction of Sandton City, the International Terminal at OR Tambo International Airport, the Carlton Centre, new Rand Afrikaans University (now University of Johannesburg), and the JG Strijdom (since renamed the Hillbrow Tower) in Hillbrow, Central Johannesburg. Most of these buildings were conceived in the late 1960s.

=== 1960s ===
In 1968, Rapp and Maister property developers purchased land consisting of 4 hectares opposite the future Sandton municipal site on the corner of 5th Street and Rivonia Road. Previously the location was the site of a stud farm. Rapp and Maister proposed to build a large shopping mall with an office tower on their site on this highpoint in Sandton. Both the proposed new town location and the shopping centre was contested by many including the Johannesburg City Council and Sandown residents which saw the proposal brought before the Townships Board for a decision. Both municipal and Rapp and Maister's project for a R20 million, 20 storey office tower and 30,000 m^{2} retail space was approved. They also were allowed additional retail space up to 90,000 m^{2}, 60,000 m^{2} of office space and 20,000 m^{2} of space for other uses.

=== 1970s ===
Sandton City opened in 1973 with 120 stores on two levels of 50,000 m^{2}, and added two additional levels of parking for 2,500 cars and outside parking with 25,000 m^{2} of office space. It was also the first of its kind in Johannesburg. Upon opening, the scale and depth of the centre revolutionised South African and Johannesburg retail. The outer plaza to the east housed offices, branches of Nedbank and Barclays (later to become First National Bank), medical suites and a steak house. A bridge connected the outer plaza to what was then Sandton Library, a medical clinic and the Sandton Council building. In its early stages in the 1970s, the small lower floor housed a post office and a Ster-Kinekor cinema complex that is still there today.

=== 1980s ===
According to the Sandton City website, by 1983 there were 240 stores and 8,000 parking bays while the five-star towers were launched, and 44,000 m^{2} of space added. The 564 room Sandton Sun Hotel was built in 1984 as part of the complex.

=== 1990s ===
During this time, Sandton City underwent major refurbishment of common areas. The area in front of the Sandton Library was developed into a new shopping centre, Sandton Square, connected by a sky-bridge. A pyramid-shaped roof was added in the 1990s and provides the distinguishing architectural feature of Sandton City.

=== 2000s ===
In 2001, stores were increased to 295 while parking bays were boosted to 10,000. A new food court and giant video wall were also constructed. The Home Living retail level was developed in 2002, and the cinema complex received a refurbishment in the same year.

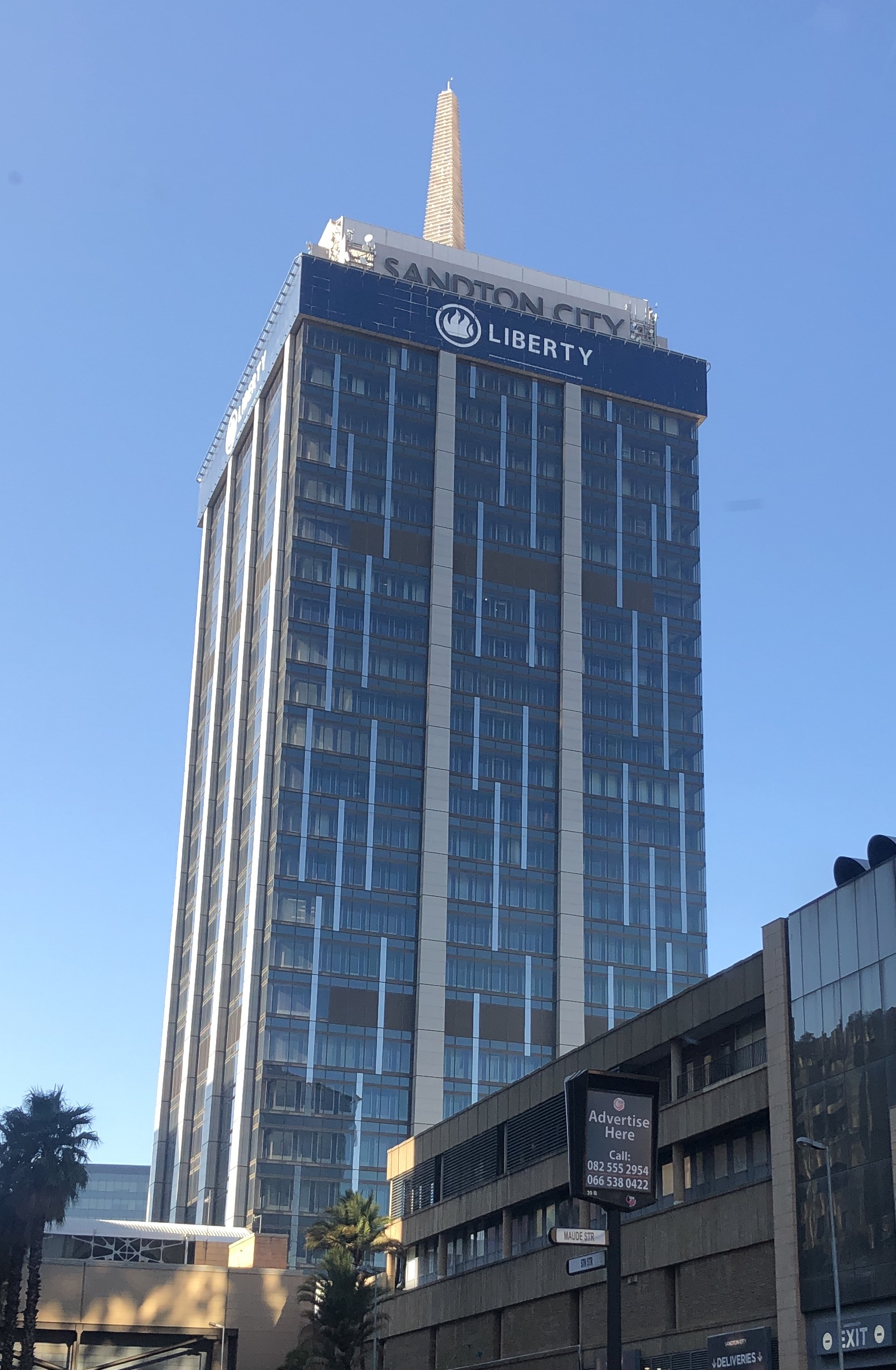

=== 2010s ===
In 2013, the Twin Towers office section of Sandton City was completely re-clad with a contemporary glass shell (these are now called Atrium on 5th). In 2014, the office tower received a complete external revamp, with new cladding applied over the original concrete structure. A new wing was also added to the mall, joining the Edgars and Woolworths Courts. A major refurbishment of the entertainment areas and adjoining stores commenced in 2017 and will be completed in 2018.

=== 2020s ===
On 26 March 2020, the worldwide pandemic, COVID-19, forced Sandton City among other malls across Johannesburg, to shut the majority of its stores down during South Africa's lockdown. Supermarkets, pharmacies, and other essential stores such as banks and mobile operating stores were allowed to remain open during this phase. The stores reopened after the lockdown restrictions eased.

== See also ==
- List of upscale shopping districts
