= Johannes Andries (Dries) de Ridder =

Johannes Andries (Dries) de Ridder (1898 - 1960) was the first Secretary of the South African National Parks Board, formed in 1926, which was renamed the South African National Parks (SANParks), after 1994. After World War II, he served as Secretary of State Advances and thereafter, in 1958, Secretary of Social Welfare and Pensions until his death in 1960.

Dries was married to Cecile Hendrika Johanna Punt, the sister of dr. Willem H.J. Punt (1900–1981) who founded the Stigting Simon van der Stel (presently known as the Heritage Association of South Africa, it is "the largest and oldest conservation lobby group in South Africa").
