= Statue of Nelson Mandela, Johannesburg =

Statue in Sandton, Gauteng

Statue of Nelson Mandela
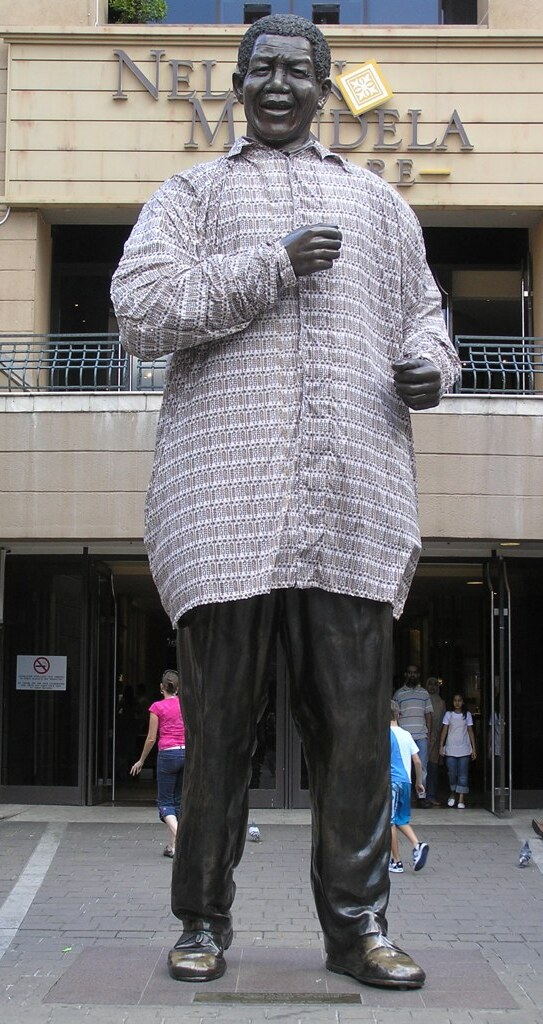
- The statue in 2009
- Artist: Kobus Hattingh and Jacob Maponyane
- Year: 31 March 2004
- Medium: Bronze
- Subject: Nelson Mandela
- Dimensions: 6 m × 2.3 m (240 in × 91 in)
- Location: 26°06′26″S 28°03′17″E

The statue of Nelson Mandela is a large bronze sculpture of the former President of South Africa and anti-apartheid activist Nelson Mandela, located in Nelson Mandela Square in Sandton, Gauteng.

== Location ==
Prior to the statue's unveiling, the square had been named Sandton Square after the surrounding area of Sandton. The square was officially renamed Nelson Mandela Square on 31 March 2004. Sandton City, the largest retail complex in Africa, lies behind the statue. The location of the statue has been criticized due to Sandton Square's perception as a "symbol of commercial and social elitism".

== History ==
The statue was commissioned in July 2002 and completed in February 2004. It was unveiled in the square on 31 March 2004. It was sculpted by Kobus Hattingh and Jacob Maponyane.

The statue was erected in conjunction with the 10th anniversary of South Africa's first democratic elections. It was the first-ever public statue of Mandela and was unveiled by his eldest granddaughter, Ndileka Mandela, who said of the statue that "While we honour Nelson Mandela in this statue, we are also honouring South Africa. He's not just a grandfather to us, but to the whole nation". A box for donations for the Nelson Mandela Foundation was placed beside the statue.

== Description ==
The statue stands 6 metres (20 ft) high and measures 2.3 metres (7 ft 7 in) from elbow to elbow. The statue weighs 2.5 tons. It has been described as "towering", "imposing", and a "focal point" for the entire area.

The statue depicts Mandela wearing his Madiba shirt and dancing in what was referred to at the unveiling as the "Madiba jive". Basetsana Kumalo, the master of ceremonies at the statue's unveiling, said that it was "a very happy statue. The dancing stance pays tribute to the spirit of joy and celebration inherent in the people of South Africa – this is the Madiba jive".

== See also ==
- List of awards and honours bestowed on Nelson Mandela
- Statue of Nelson Mandela, Parliament Square
- Statue of Nelson Mandela, Balcony Cape Town City Hall overlooking the Grand Parade
