= Statue of Nelson Mandela, Parliament Square =

Sculpture in London, by Ian Walters

Coordinates: 51.50041°N 0.12734°W

Nelson Mandela
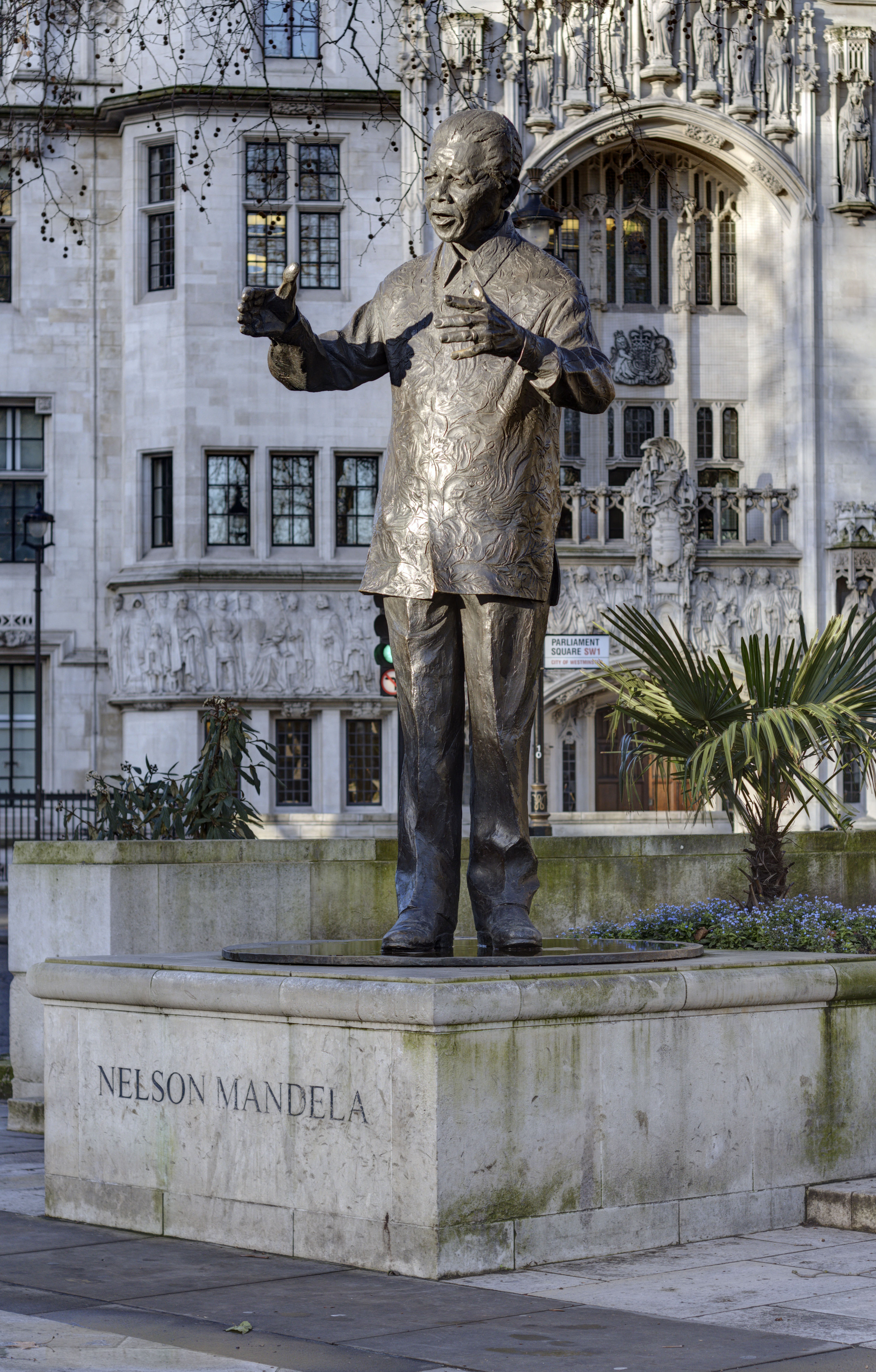
- Artist: Ian Walters
- Year: 2007
- Type: Bronze
- Location: London, SW1 United Kingdom

Nelson Mandela is a bronze sculpture by Ian Walters in Parliament Square, London, of former President of South Africa and anti-apartheid activist Nelson Mandela. Originally proposed to Mandela by Donald Woods in 2001, a fund was set up and led by Woods's wife and Richard Attenborough after the death of Woods. The then Mayor of London Ken Livingstone sought permission from Westminster City Council to locate the statue on the north terrace of Trafalgar Square, but this was rejected and it was located in Parliament Square instead where it was unveiled on 29 August 2007.

== Description ==
The statue is 9 feet (2.7 m) high, and made in bronze. The plinth the statue stands on is shorter than the other statues located in Parliament Square. It was created by English sculptor Ian Walters, at a cost of £400,000, although he died before its unveiling. Mandela had sat with Walters in 2001 as a model for the statue. Fellow sculptor Glyn Williams criticised the statue at a public inquiry during the planning process, saying that it is "an adequate portrait but nothing more".

== History ==
A bronze resin bust of Mandela, also by Walters, had been installed on the South Bank in 1982. This had been subject to vandalism, and a bronze replacement was installed in 1988.

Donald Woods originally proposed the idea of a statue of Nelson Mandela for London; the fundraising to create the statue was led by his wife and Lord Richard Attenborough after his death. Woods gained approval from Mandela in 2001, with the original idea to site the statue on a fifth plinth to be located outside the High Commission of South Africa in Trafalgar Square. The fund was officially launched at London's City Hall on 24 March 2003.

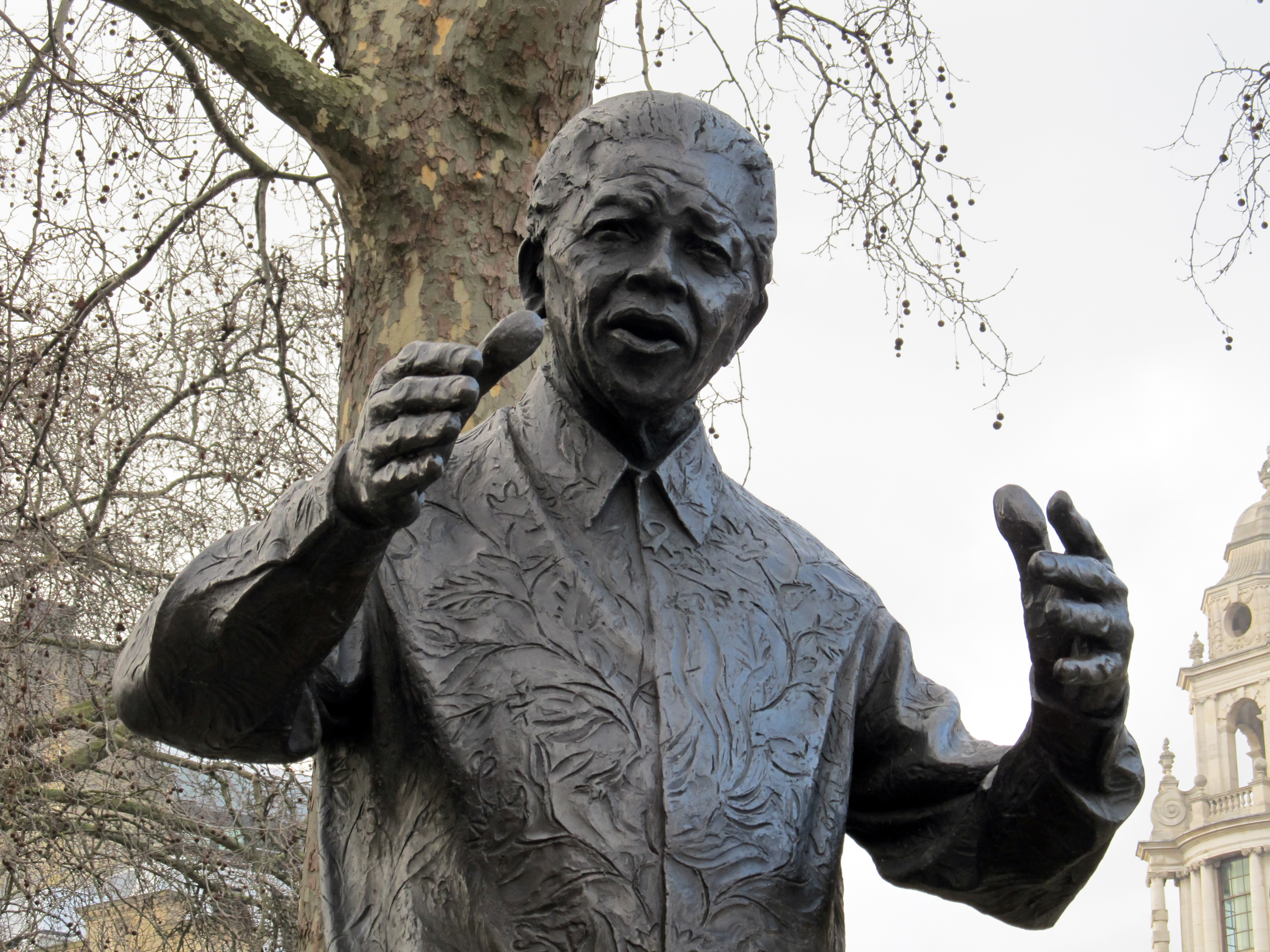
Detail of the statue

In 2004, Mayor of London Ken Livingstone publicly pledged his support for a statue of Nelson Mandela for Trafalgar Square at a celebration in the square of the 10th anniversary of democracy in South Africa. "It will be a square of two Nelsons. The man up there, his battle of Trafalgar was the defining battle that paved the way for 100 years of British empire, and Nelson Mandela looking down on this square will symbolise the peaceful transition to a world without empires." Westminster City Council turned down the planning application to position the statue in the square's north terrace near the National Gallery on the grounds that it would impede events in the area and would end the symmetrical layout of that part of the square. The Mayor appealed to the office of the Deputy Prime Minister, which agreed with the council's decision. However the Deputy Prime Minister stated that he supported the location of the statue on an alternative site, while the council suggested placing the statue outside the High Commission of South Africa along the side of the square. The Liberal Democrats of the London Assembly later criticised the use of £100,000 by the London Mayor to appeal Westminster Council's decision, saying that "Thousands of pounds of taxpayers money is set to be wasted in these costly arguments."

In April 2007, Westminster City Council completed a further review of possible locations for the statue. It was decided to locate the statue in Parliament Square alongside the statues of other important figures including Abraham Lincoln, Benjamin Disraeli, Jan Smuts, and Churchill. Mandela had secretly visited London in the 1960s, and on seeing the statue of Jan Smuts in Parliament Square had joked with Oliver Tambo that perhaps there would be statues of them replacing it one day.

The statue was unveiled by British Prime Minister Gordon Brown on 29 August 2007, in a ceremony held in Parliament Square. Among the attendees were Mandela, his wife Graça Machel, and Livingstone. In a speech, Mandela said that it fulfilled a dream for there to be a statue of a black man in Parliament Square, and that "Though this statue is of one man, it should in actual fact symbolise all those who have resisted oppression, especially in my country".

The statue was temporarily covered up in June 2020 after protesters defaced a statue of Winston Churchill, attempted to vandalise The Cenotaph in London, and pulled down a statue of Edward Colston in Bristol during the Black Lives Matter protests. Far-right group Britain First called for the statue of Mandela to be "torn down".

== See also ==
- Statue of Nelson Mandela, Johannesburg
- Statue of Nelson Mandela, Balcony Cape Town City Hall overlooking the Grand Parade
