= Nelson Mandela Square =

Shopping centre in Johannesburg, South Africa

Coordinates: 26.1074°S 28.0546°E

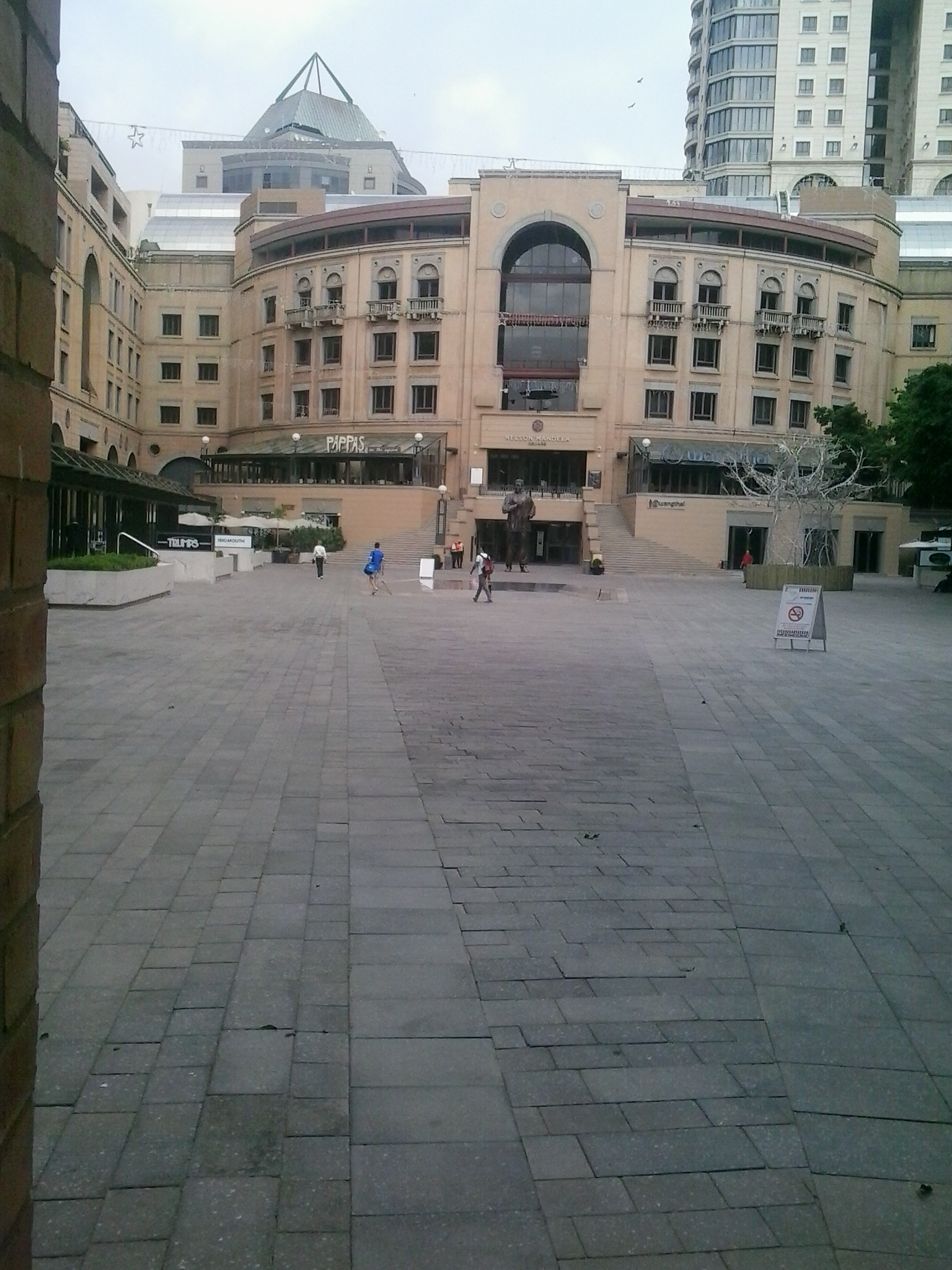
- The Square in 2015
- Interactive map of Nelson Mandela Square
- Former name: Sandton Square
- Namesake: Nelson Mandela
- Location: Sandton, Johannesburg, South Africa
- Postal code: 2196

Other
- Website: nelsonmandelasquare.co.za

Nelson Mandela Square is a shopping centre in Sandton, Johannesburg, South Africa. It includes a large open area built to resemble a traditional European town square, and an office complex. The centre was formerly known as Sandton Square and was named for the former president of South Africa and anti-apartheid activist Nelson Mandela in March 2004. A six-metre high statue of Mandela was unveiled at the square's renaming ceremony. It is attached to the large Sandton City shopping centre, together forming one of the largest retail complexes on the continent with over 400 stores. The Michelangelo Towers complex adjoins Nelson Mandela Square.

== History ==
The Square, then known by its original name of Sandton Square, was first opened to the public in 1994. The shopping centre was designed in a faux-Italian style and the square was designed to resemble St Marks Square in Venice. Its design included a library, theatre and gallery.

On its 10th anniversary, in 2004, it was officially renamed Nelson Mandela Square after the unveiling of a bronze, six-metre tall statue of Mandela. It was the first public statue of Mandela in the country. It was commissioned in July 2002 and completed in February 2004 by South African Sculptors Kobus Hattingh and Jacob Maponyane. It weighs approximately 2.5 tons.

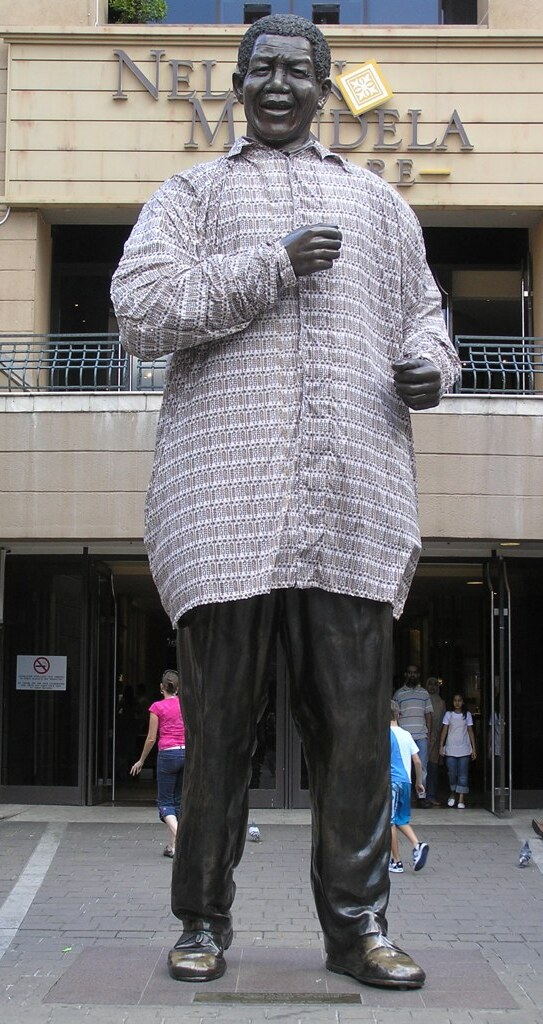
The statue in 2009

The decision to rename the Square after Mandela was criticised by some as Mandela had long stood for the disadvantaged and the square stands in the most opulent area of the country. Gary Vipond, the Square's manager, defended the decision by explaining that, "The Square is optimistic, expressive and confident, like the Madiba jive, and represents a sophisticated, eclectic, cosmopolitan success story."

The shopping centre is connected to Sandton City and, together, they form the largest retail complex in Africa. The square itself is approximately 1000 square metres and houses many shops, restaurants and a library on the far end.

== See also ==
- List of awards and honours bestowed on Nelson Mandela
