= Palace Yard =

Palace Yard may refer to:

- New Palace Yard
- Old Palace Yard

== See also ==
- Palace of Westminster
