= Silver Jubilee of Elizabeth II =

25th anniversary of the monarch's accession

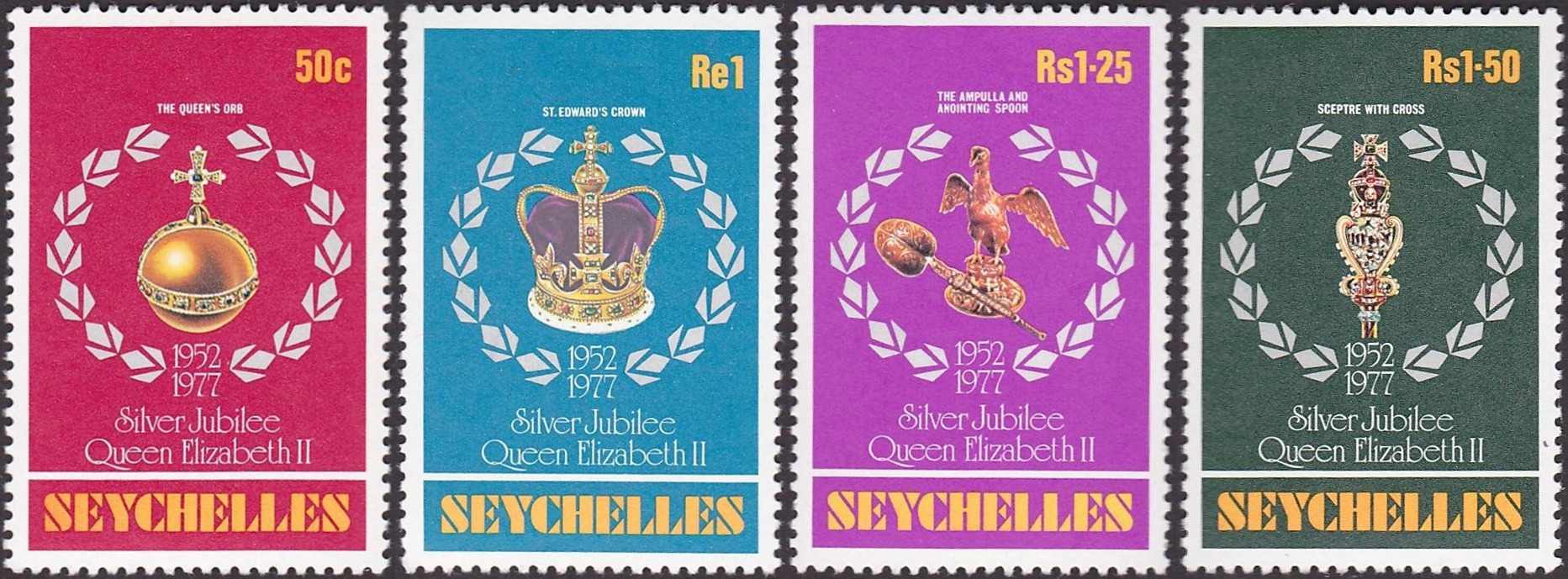
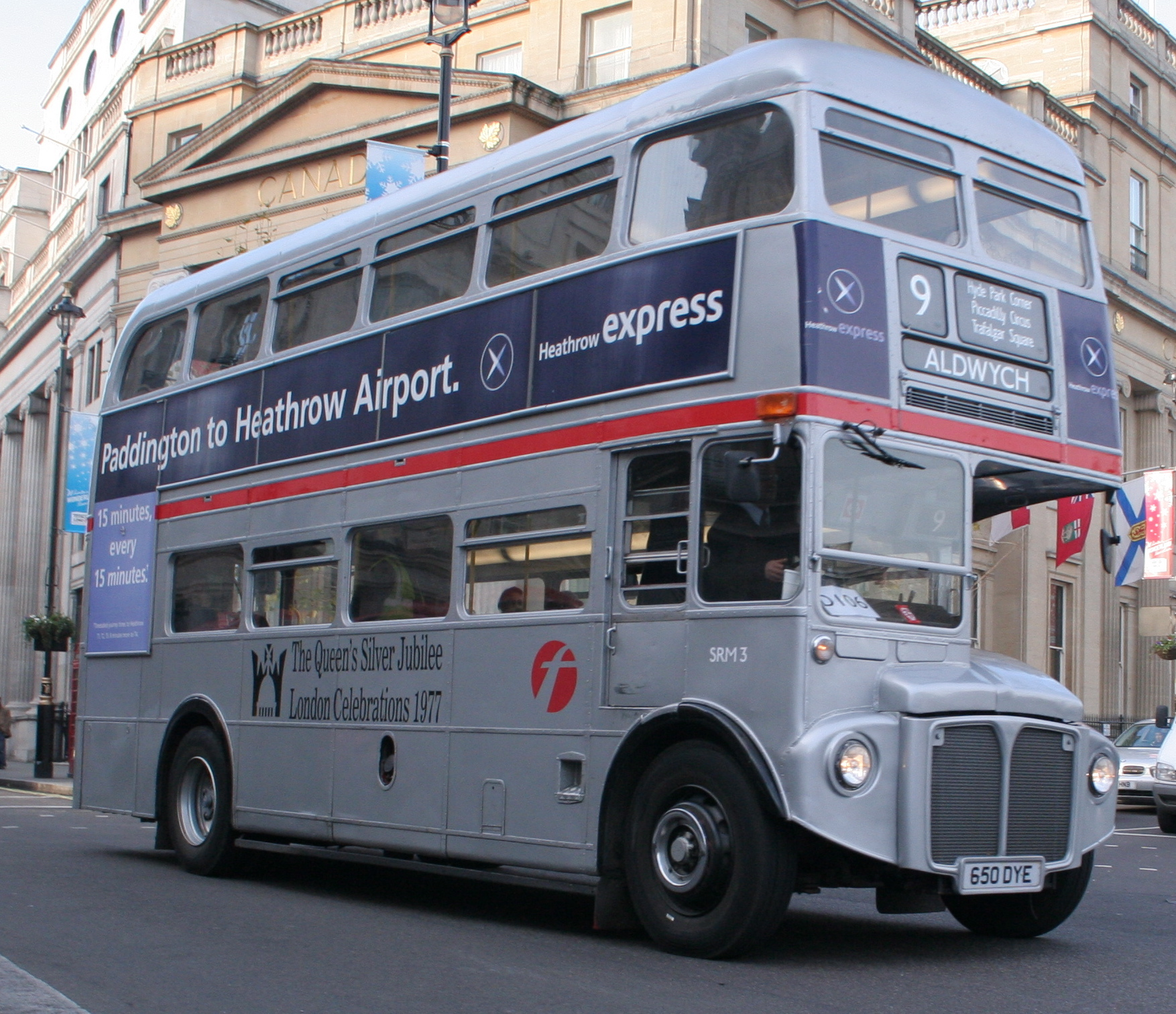
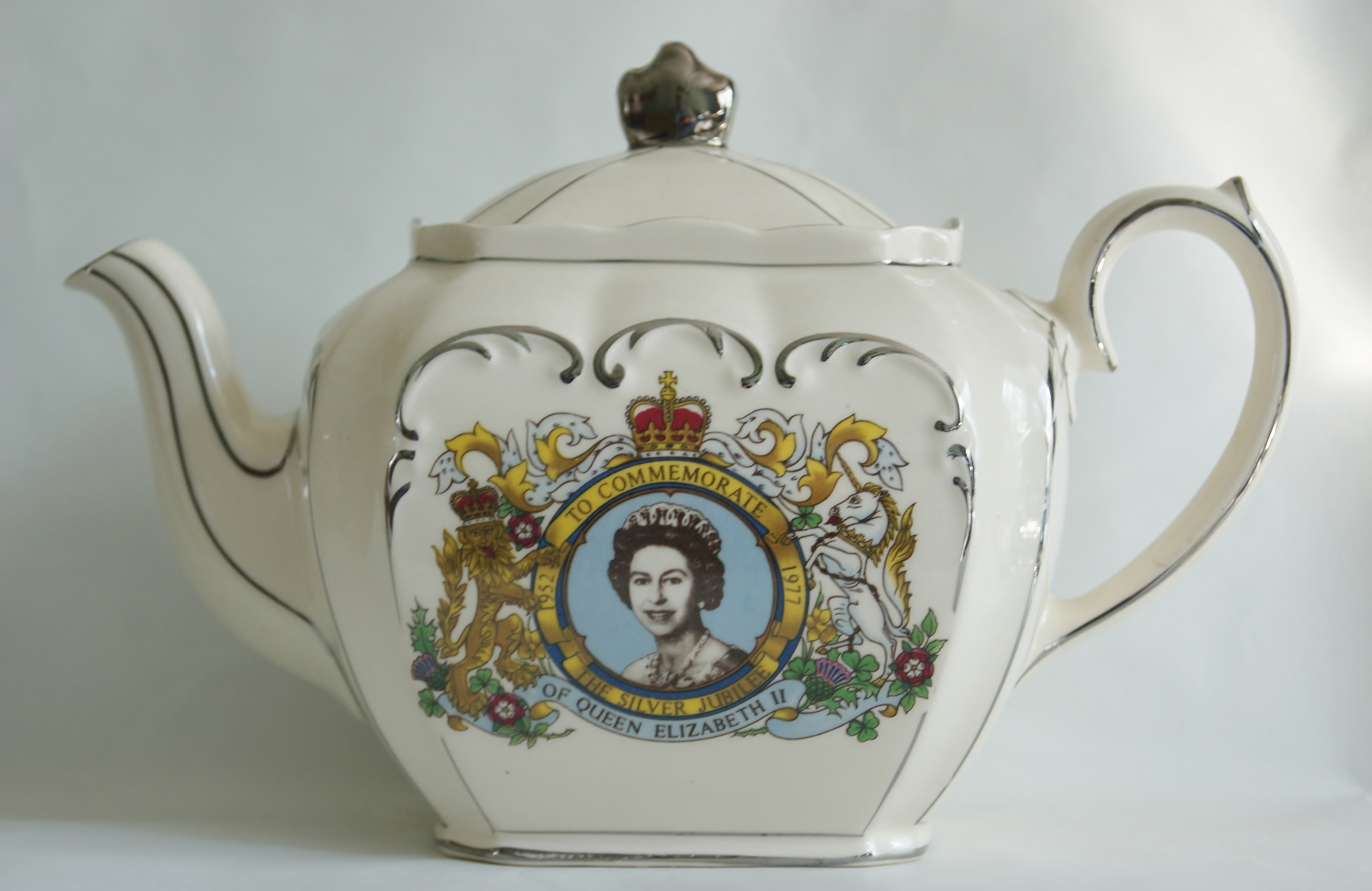
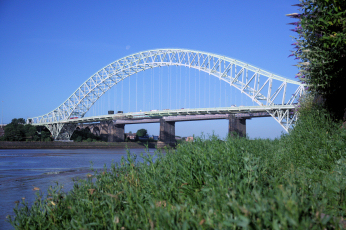
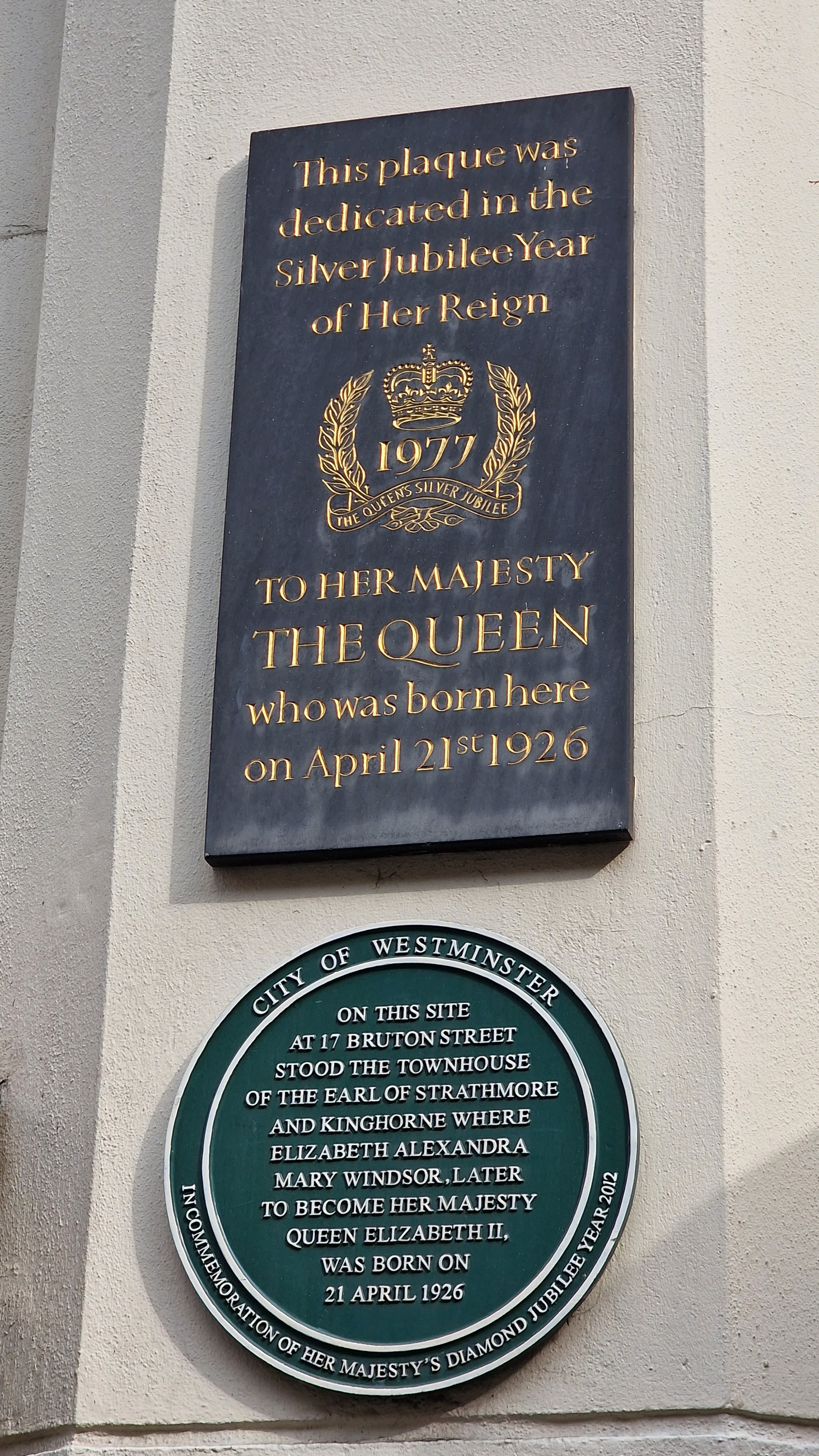
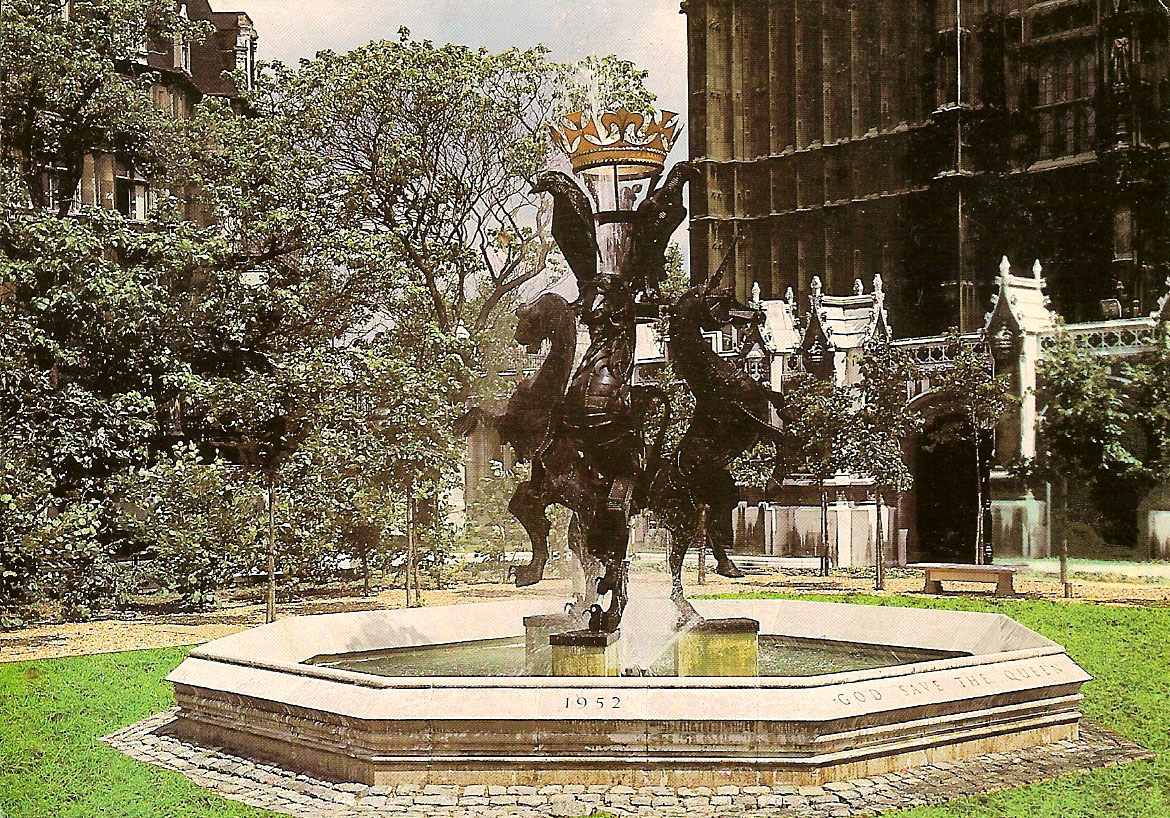
- Collage of commemorations of the jubilee, Clockwise: A commemorative stamp set from Seychelles; A Commemorative Teapot; Runcorn Bridge which was renamed Silver Jubilee Bridge; The Jubilee Fountain constructed in New Palace Yard; A Plaque dedicated for the Queen in the Silver Jubilee Year; Routemaster bus painted in Silver Jubilee livery
- Genre: Jubilee of the monarch of British Monarchs and the other Commonwealth realms
- Date: 6 February 1977; 49 years ago
- Country: London; Canada; Australia; New Zealand; Commonwealth of Nations
- Previous event: Silver Jubilee of George V
- Next event: Ruby Jubilee of Elizabeth II

The Silver Jubilee of Elizabeth II marked the 25th anniversary of the accession of Queen Elizabeth II on 6 February 1977. It was celebrated with large-scale parties and parades throughout London and the Commonwealth throughout 1977, culminating in June with the official "Jubilee Days", held to coincide with the Queen's Official Birthday. The anniversary date itself was commemorated in church services across the land on 6 February 1977, and continued to be for the rest of that month. In March, preparations started for large parties in every major of the city, as well as for smaller ones for countless individual streets throughout the country.

== National and international goodwill visits ==
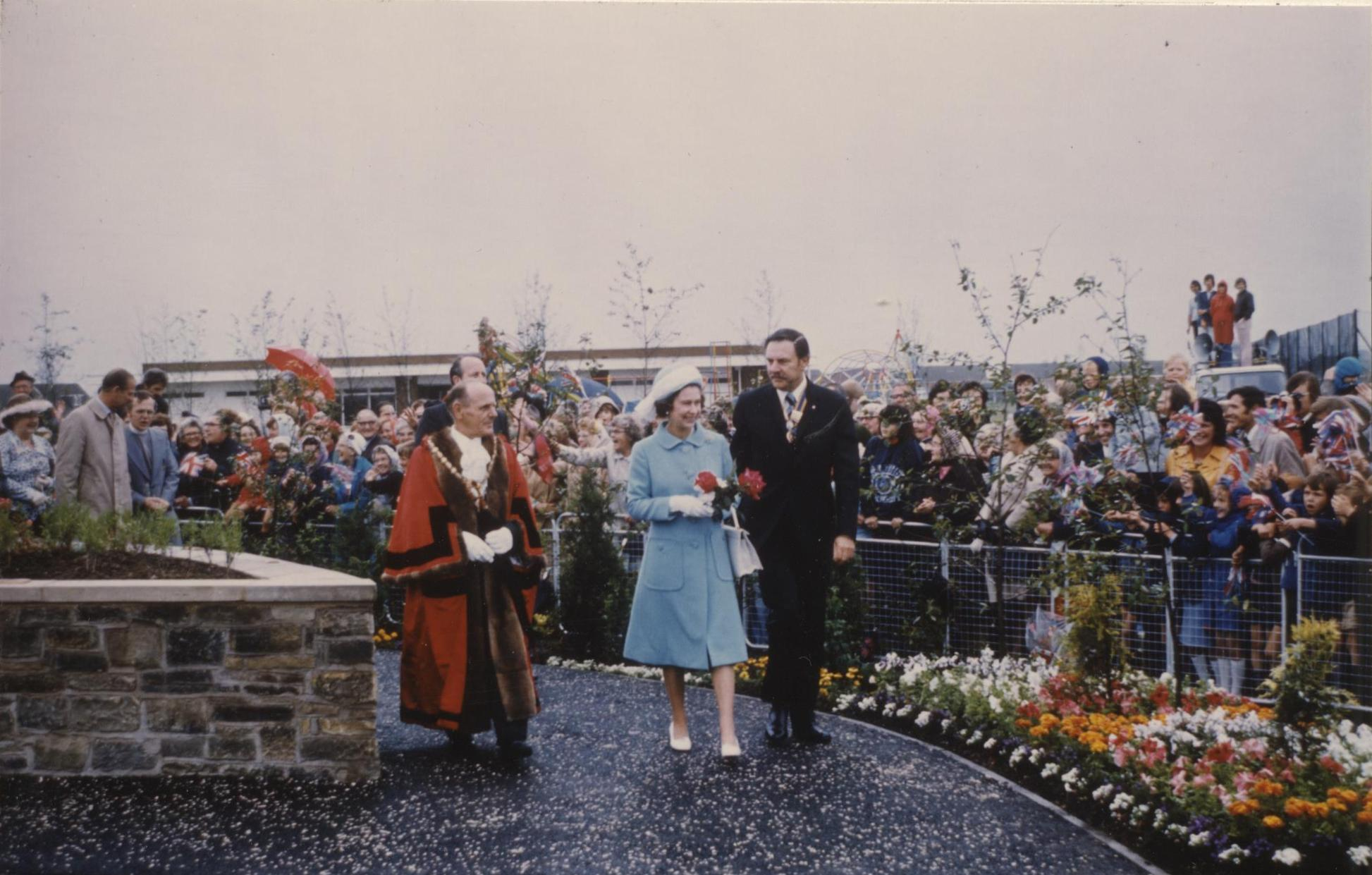
The Queen at the unveiling of a Scented Garden for the Blind, Haverstoe Park, Cleethorpes, 1977

No monarch before Queen Elizabeth II had visited more of the United Kingdom in such a short span of time (the trips lasted three months). All in all, the Queen and her husband Prince Philip visited a total of 36 counties. The trip started with record crowds gathering to see the Queen and Prince Philip in Glasgow, Scotland, on 17 May. After moving to England (where a record one million spectators came to greet the couple in Lancashire) and Wales, the Queen and Prince Philip wrapped up the first of their trips with a visit to Northern Ireland. Among the places visited during the national trips were numerous schools, which were the subject of a television special hosted by presenter Valerie Singleton.

Later in the summer, the Queen and Prince Philip embarked on a Commonwealth visit that first brought them to island nations such as Fiji and Tonga, following up with longer stints in New Zealand and Australia, with a final stop in Papua New Guinea before going on to the British holdings in the West Indies. The final stop on the international tour was a trip to Canada, in which Prince Charles joined the couple to greet the crowds.

== Jubilee celebrations ==
=== Australia ===
During the Queen's Silver Jubilee tour of Australia in March 1977, a Silver Jubilee Parade was held in front of Parliament House, Canberra.

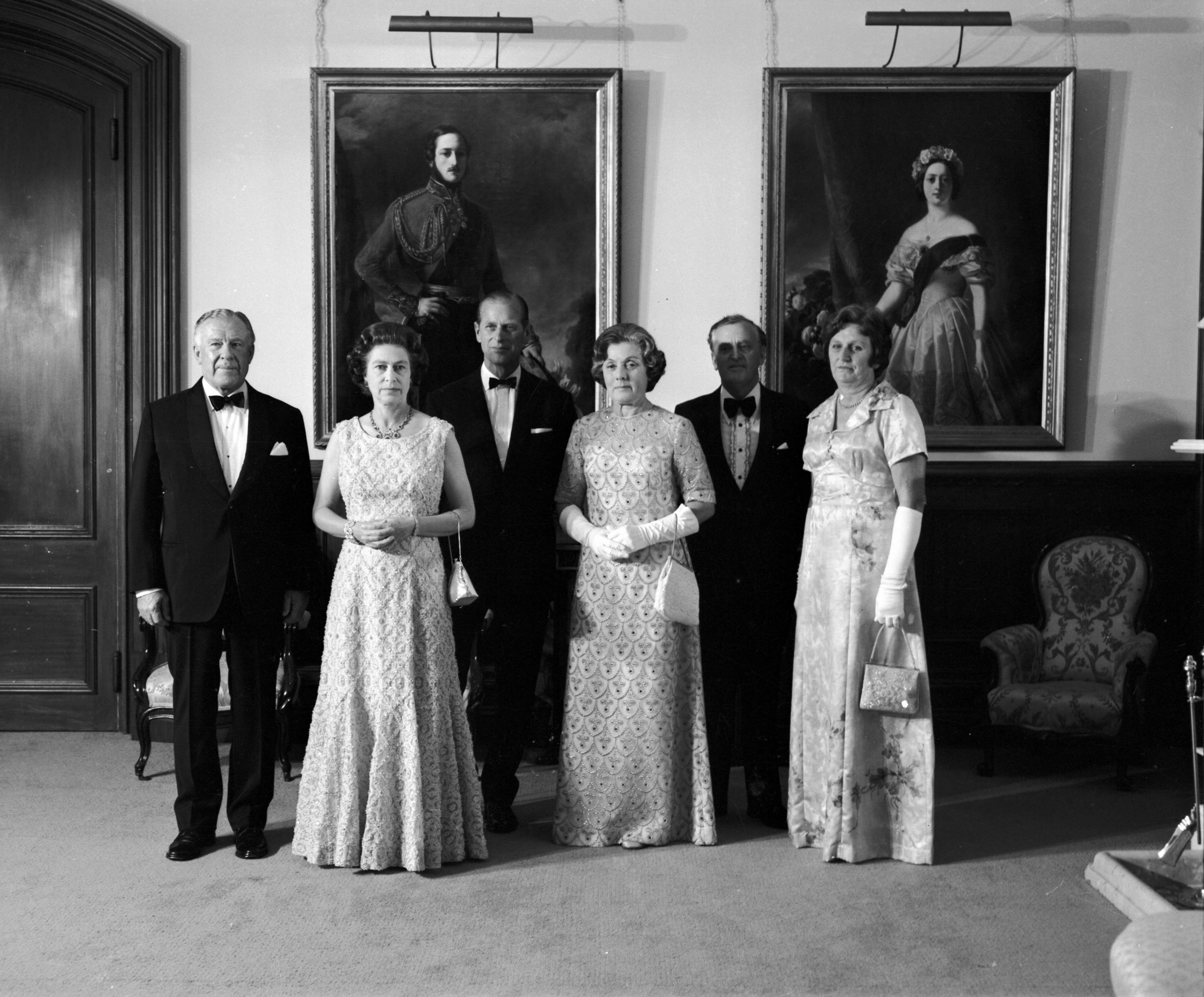
The Queen at Government House, Brisbane, during her Silver Jubilee tour of Australia

The Royal Australian Mint released a commemorative Silver Jubilee 50c coin, which featured twenty-five representations of St Edward's Crown.

Two commemoratives stamps were released by Australia Post to celebrate the Jubilee.

Australian artist Paul Fitzgerald was commissioned to complete the only official portrait of the Queen during the Silver Jubilee year.

The 1977 Silver Jubilee and Queen's Birthday Honours in Australia were announced on 14 June 1977.

Silver Jubilee celebrations culminated in December 1977 with 35,000 serving personnel taking part in open parades across Australia.

=== Canada ===
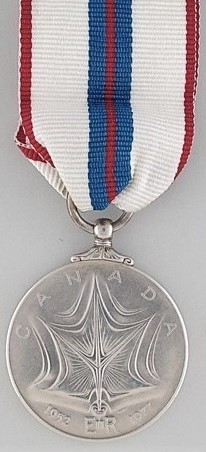
Canadian version of the Silver Jubilee medal

The Queen and her husband visited Canada in 1977 to mark her Silver Jubilee. During the tour, the Queen attended the opening of the Parliamentary session and delivered the Speech from the throne, the second time in Canadian history that she had done so.

To mark the milestone, Canada instituted a Silver Jubilee medal on 6 February 1977. It was awarded to individuals who had been deemed to have made a significant contribution to their fellow citizens, their community or to Canada.

A 25-cent stamp was issued to celebrate the Silver Jubilee in Canada.

The Queen Elizabeth II Silver Jubilee Endowment Fund for Study in a Second Language was launched that provided funding for young Canadians interested in increasing their proficiency in another language.

=== New Zealand ===
During the Queen's Silver Jubilee tour of New Zealand from 22 February to 7 March 1977, she and Prince Philip visited 11 centres in New Zealand. The Queen opened the Beehive, Parliament's new executive wing in Wellington.

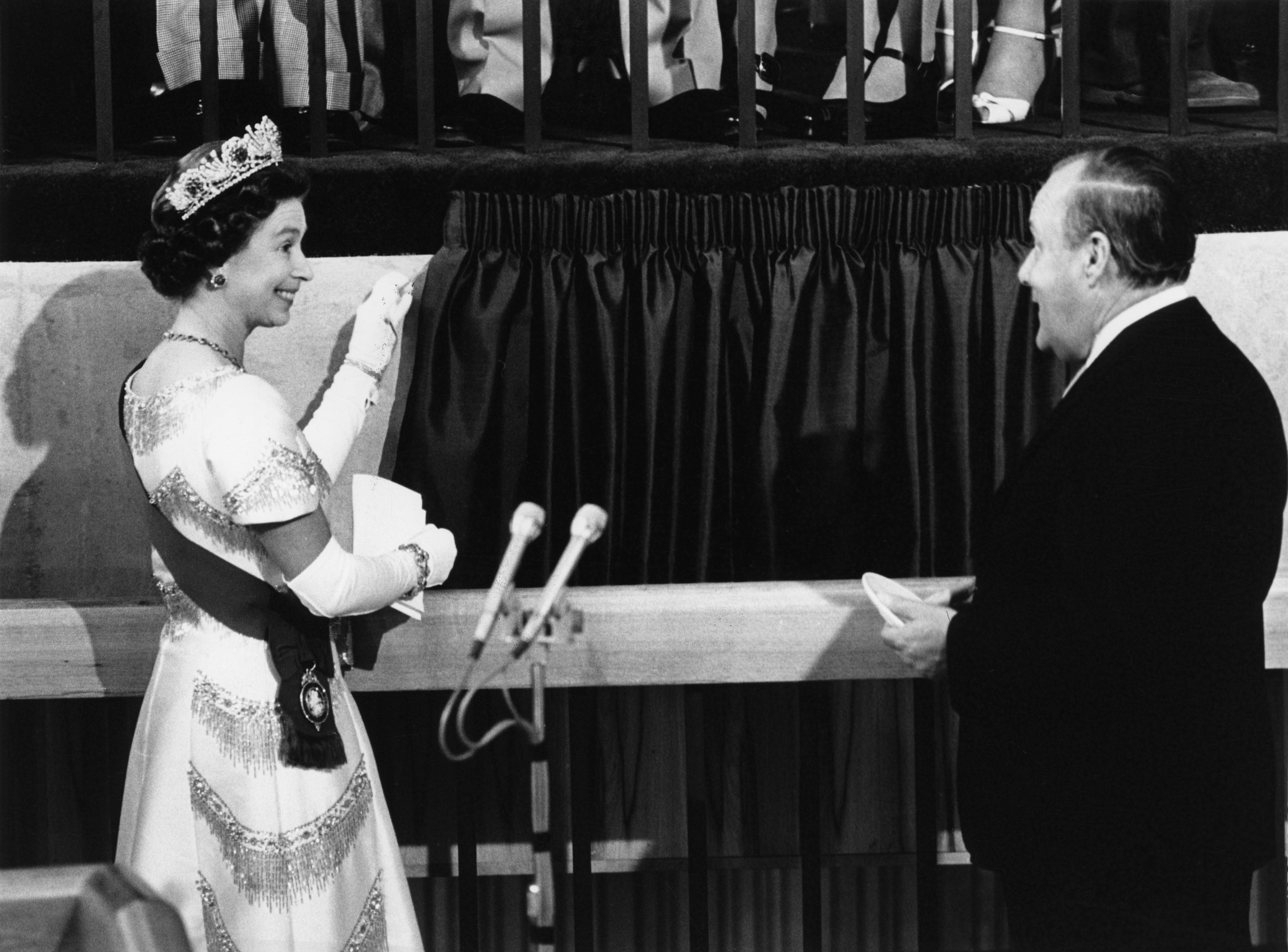
The Queen opening the Beehive during her Silver Jubilee tour of New Zealand

A set of stamps was released by the New Zealand Post Office to mark the Queen's Silver Jubilee.

To commemorate the Silver Jubilee, Queen Elizabeth the Second National Trust was established in New Zealand as a national trust to encourage and promote the provision, protection, and enhancement of open space for the benefit and enjoyment of the people of New Zealand.

The 1977 Queen's Silver Jubilee and Birthday Honours in New Zealand were announced on 11 June 1977.

=== United Kingdom ===
The official emblem of the Queen's Silver Jubilee

On 3 May, a humble address was presented to the Queen on the occasion of her Silver Jubilee. The next day, she addressed Parliament at Westminster Hall, and her speech was deemed controversial by some parliamentarians. The Queen referred to "keen discussion of proposals for devolution to Scotland and Wales within the United Kingdom". While she could "readily understand these aspirations", the Queen added that she could not "forget that I was crowned Queen of the United Kingdom of Great Britain and Northern Ireland. Perhaps this Jubilee is a time to remind ourselves of the benefits which union has conferred, at home and in our international dealings, on the inhabitants of all parts of this United Kingdom". The Scottish National Party MP Donald Stewart later asked if Prime Minister James Callaghan accepted "responsibility" for the Queen's remarks.

On such an occasion we think of the Throne as an institution and of the Queen as a person. In conjunction with Parliament, the Throne as an institution enables us to maintain a stability that is widely admired overseas. Together, the Sovereign and Parliament provide the instruments by which momentous changes have been, are and will continue to be reconciled with continuity in our country.

— James Callaghan, Prime Minister of the United Kingdom, 1977

On 6 June, the Queen lit a bonfire beacon at Windsor Castle, the light of which spread across the night in a chain of other beacons throughout the whole country. On 7 June, crowds lined the route of the procession to St Paul's Cathedral, where the royal family attended a national service of thanksgiving alongside many world leaders, including United States President Jimmy Carter, and Prime Minister James Callaghan as well as all of the living former prime ministers (Harold Macmillan, Alec Douglas-Home, Sir Harold Wilson and Edward Heath). The service was followed by lunch in the Guildhall, hosted by the Lord Mayor of the City of London Peter Vanneck. At the reception, the Queen was quoted as saying:

When I was twenty-one I pledged my life to the service of our people and I asked for God's help to make good that vow. Although that vow was made in my salad days, when I was green in judgement, I do not regret nor retract one word of it.

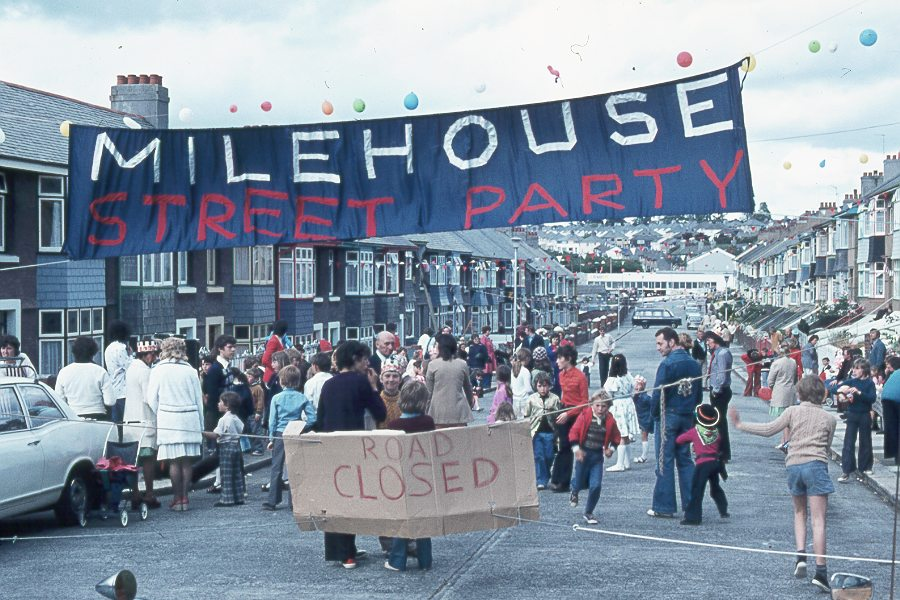
Elaborate street parties were thrown across the country, like this one in Plymouth.

After the luncheon, the procession continued down The Mall to Buckingham Palace, where an estimated one million people lined the pavements to see the family wave to onlookers. A further 500 million people around the Commonwealth watched the day's events on live television. On 7 June, streets and villages threw elaborate parties for all their residents, and many streets strung bunting (the little flags were usually modelled in pattern after the Union Flag) from rooftop to rooftop across the street. In addition to parties, many streets decorated motor vehicles as historical events from Britain's past, and drove them about town, organising their very own parades. In London alone there were over 4000 organised parties for individual streets and neighbourhoods. Throughout the entire day, onlookers were greeted by the Queen many times as she made several appearances for pictures from the balcony of Buckingham Palace.

On 9 June, the Queen made a Royal Progress trip via boat up the River Thames from Greenwich to Lambeth, in a re-enactment of the famous progresses taken by Queen Elizabeth I. On the trip, the Queen officially opened the Silver Jubilee Walkway and the South Bank Jubilee Gardens, two of numerous places named after the festivities. In the evening, she presided over a fireworks display and was taken subsequently by a procession of lighted carriages to Buckingham Palace, where she greeted onlookers yet again from her balcony.

== Lasting impact ==
A fountain in the central lawn of the New Palace Yard was installed in 1977 to commemorate the Silver Jubilee and recalls the lost medieval fountain of Henry VI. The fountain stands in an octagonal pool in the centre of which is a large welded steel sculpture by Walenty Pytel. The sculpture is decorated with depictions of birds and beasts from six continents and is surmounted by a gilded crown.

Various places were named after the Jubilee. The under-construction "Fleet line" of the London Underground was renamed the Jubilee line, and given a silver line colour, though it did not open until 1979. Other places named after the Jubilee were the Silver Jubilee Walkway and the Jubilee Gardens, South Bank, London. The Silver Jubilee Bridge – connecting Runcorn and Widnes across the Mersey – was also renamed in honour of this jubilee.

Apart from names, the Jubilee also saw the borough of Derby granted the status of a city.

Similar parties and parades were planned for the Golden Jubilee in 2002.

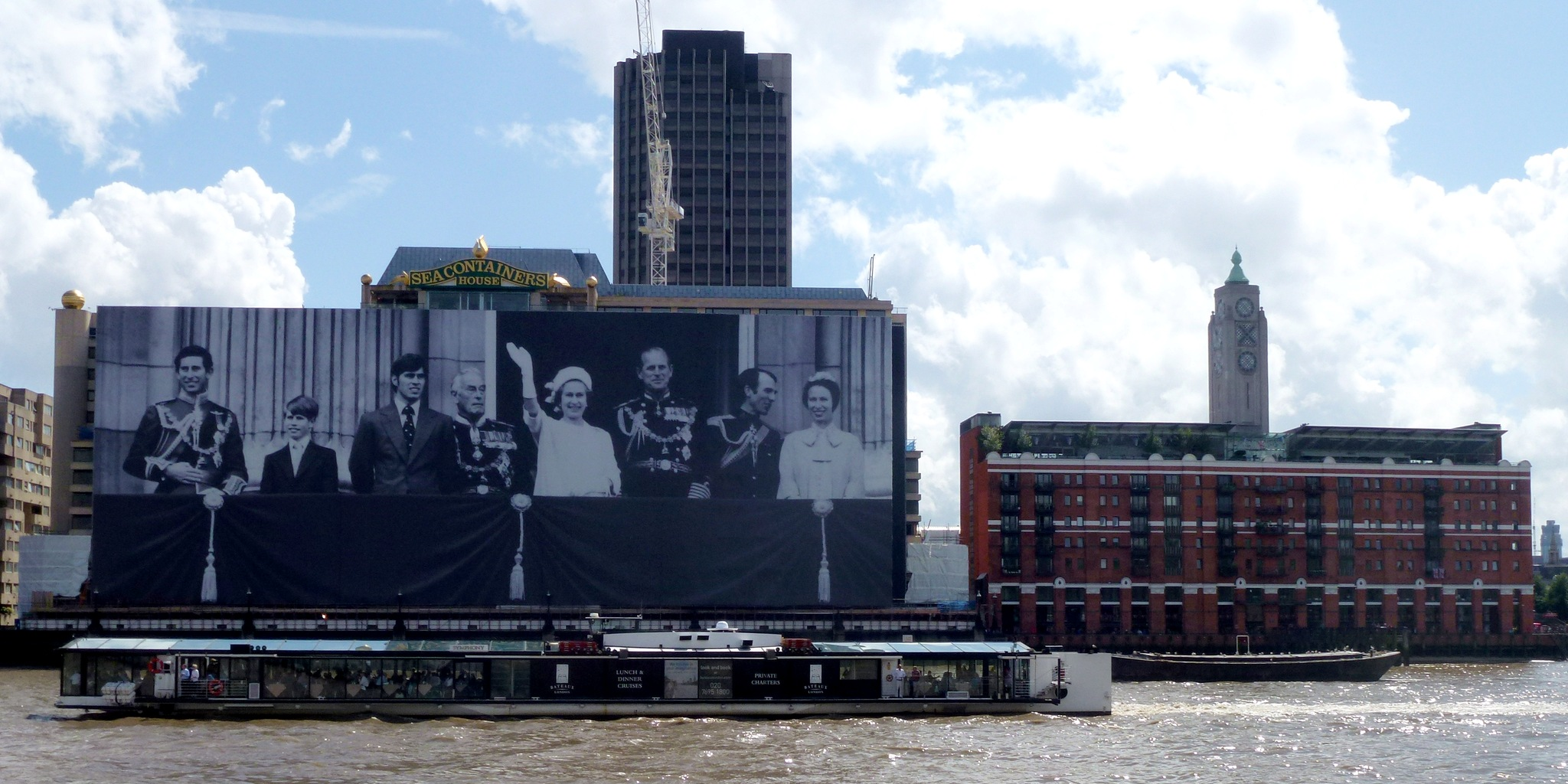
Sea Containers House decorated for Queen Elizabeth II's Diamond Jubilee

For the Diamond Jubilee of Elizabeth II in 2012, a 100 m (330 ft) by 70 m (230 ft) print of a photograph of the British royal family taken during her Silver Jubilee celebrations at Buckingham Palace was erected in front of the Sea Containers House under renovation.

== Commemorative memorabilia ==
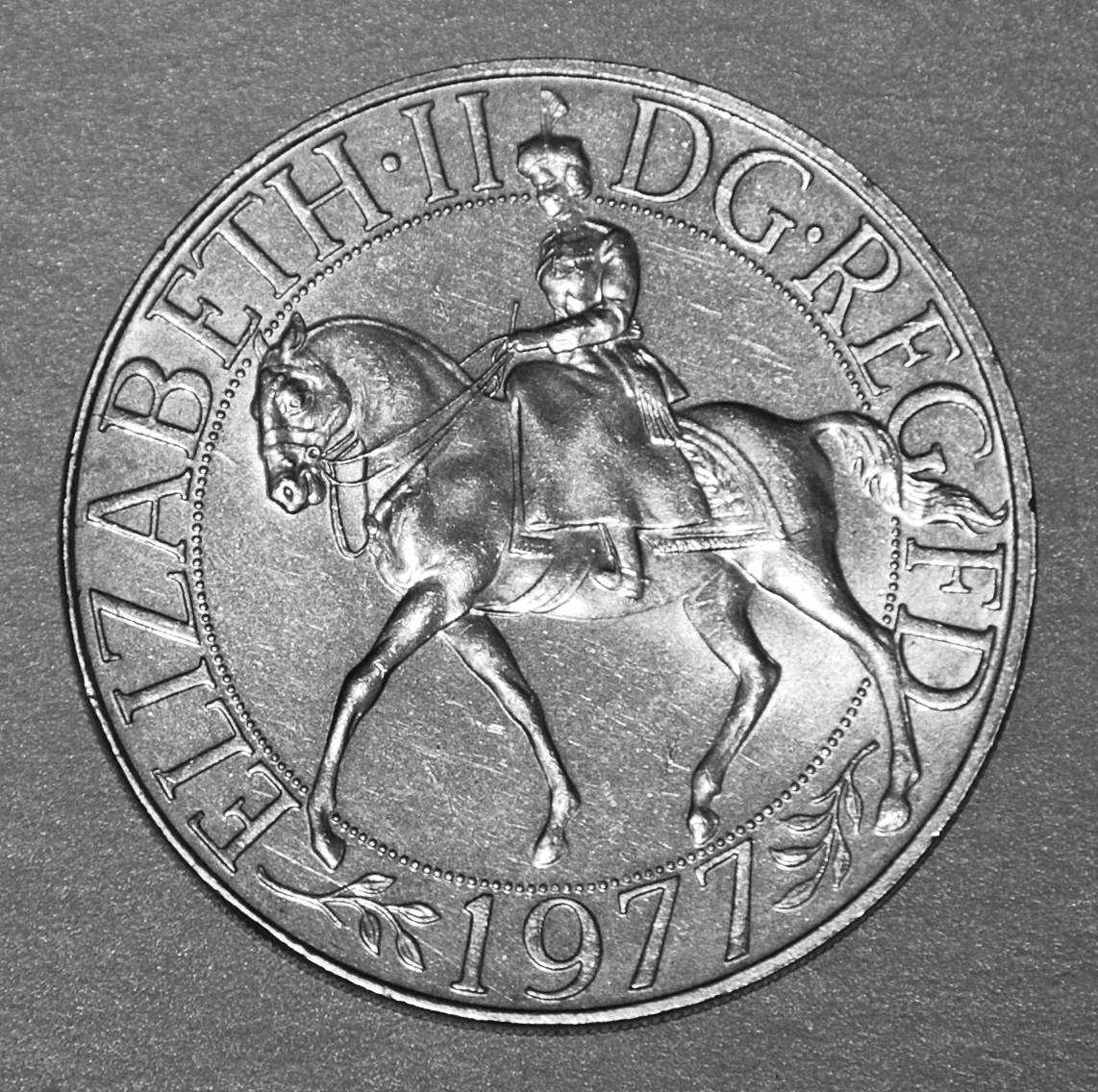
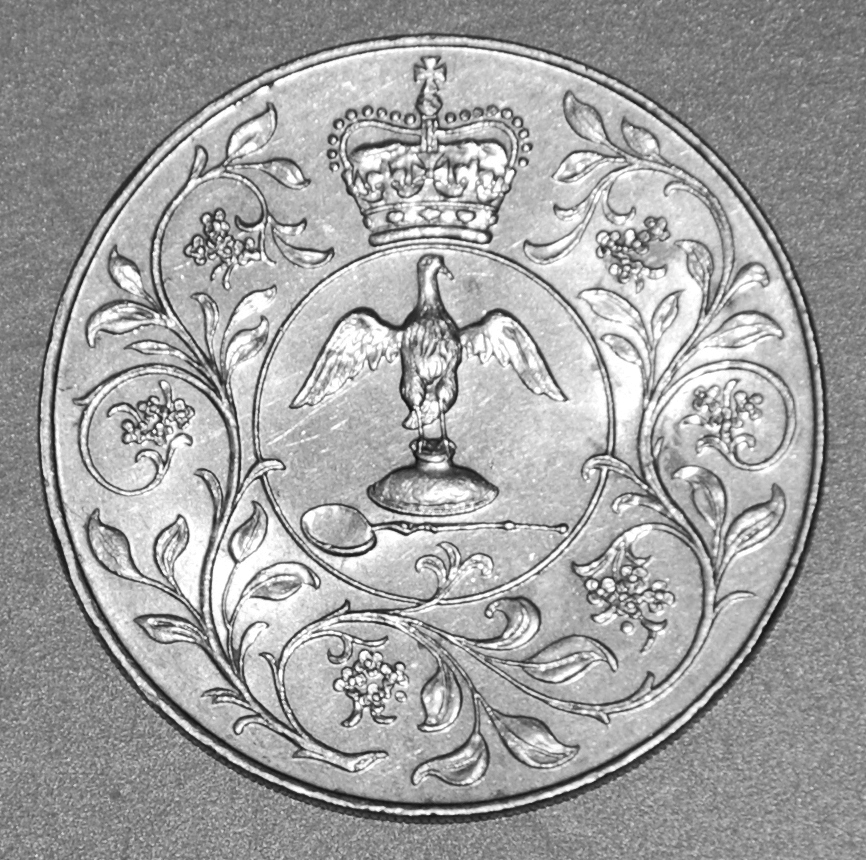
A Silver Jubilee Crown coin, 1977

A round silver pendant, designed by the then newly retired English rower, John Pinches, was issued by Franklin Mint in 1977 to commemorate the Silver Jubilee. The double-sided oval pendant has a distinctive design incorporating the four emblems of the countries of the United Kingdom: the Tudor rose for England, daffodils for Wales, thistles for Scotland and shamrocks for Northern Ireland.

Around the edges of the pendant can be seen Silver Jubilee 1977, (C) JP 77 P and a full hallmark: JP (maker's mark for John Pinches), 925, London Assay Office mark for imported silver, date stamp C (for year 1977) and queen's head (for silver jubilee year).

== In popular culture ==
Before, during, and after the events of Jubilee, the event was addressed in many media of popular culture throughout the Commonwealth.

With the official UK record chart for Jubilee week about to be released, the Daily Mirror predicted that "God Save the Queen" by the British punk rock band the Sex Pistols would reach number one. As it turned out, the controversial record placed second, behind a Rod Stewart single in its fourth week at the top. Many believed that the record had actually qualified for the top spot, but that the chart had been rigged to prevent a spectacle. Sex Pistols manager Malcolm McLaren later claimed that CBS Records, which was distributing both singles, told him that the Sex Pistols were actually outselling Stewart two to one. There is evidence that an exceptional directive was issued by the British Phonographic Institute, which oversaw the chart-compiling bureau, to exclude sales from record-company operated shops such as Virgin Records's for that week only.

On 7 June, McLaren and the record label Virgin arranged to charter a private boat and have the Sex Pistols perform while sailing down the River Thames, passing Westminster Pier and the Houses of Parliament. The event, a mockery of the Queen's river procession planned for two days later, ended in chaos. Police launches forced the boat to dock, and constabulary surrounded the gangplanks at the pier. While the band members and their equipment were hustled down a side stairwell, McLaren, Vivienne Westwood, and many of the band's entourage were arrested.

On 6 and 7 June, Queen finished their A Day at the Races Tour by playing two concerts at Earls Court, London to commemorate the Jubilee. The concerts also saw the band use a lighting rig in the shape of a crown for the first time.

The soap opera Coronation Street wrote an elaborate Jubilee parade into the storyline, having Rovers' Return Inn manager Annie Walker dress up in elaborate costume as Elizabeth I. Ken Barlow and "Uncle Albert" played Sir Edmund Hillary and Sherpa Tenzing respectively. The Jubilee also figured into the time-travel storyline of a 1983 Doctor Who story, Mawdryn Undead. The Jubilee was depicted in the finale of the third season of The Crown with Olivia Colman as the Queen.

== See also ==
- List of events during the Silver Jubilee of Elizabeth II
- Queen Elizabeth II Silver Jubilee Medal
- 1977 Silver Jubilee and Birthday Honours
- Ruby Jubilee of Elizabeth II
- Golden Jubilee of Elizabeth II
- Diamond Jubilee of Elizabeth II
- Sapphire Jubilee of Elizabeth II
- Platinum Jubilee of Elizabeth II
- Rosa 'Silver Jubilee'
- List of monarchs in Britain by length of reign
- List of jubilees of British monarchs
