= List of public art in Herefordshire =

This is a list of public art in the county of Herefordshire, England. This list applies only to works of public art on permanent display in an outdoor public space. For example, this does not include artworks in museums.

== Bromyard and district ==
Image	Title / subject	Location and coordinates	Date	Artist / designer	Type	Material	Dimensions	Designation	Owner / administrator	Wikidata	Notes
	Weather vane	Burley Gate junction of the A417 and A465 52.120849°N 2.595628°W	2014		Sculpture	Steel				Q47012927	
	The Time Tower	Bromyard Bypass 52.1873809°N 2.5073337°W	2000	Phillip Bess & Diane Gorvin	Sculpture	Wood				Q47012927	
	Resting Sheep	Bromyard Heritage Centre 52.190430°N 2.506879°W	2000	Ann Campbell	Sculpture	Bronze	Lifesize		Bromyard and Winslow Town Council	Q47456415	
	Mappa Grundi	Stoke Lacy Village Hall 52.1485°N 2.5517°W	2005	Mark de la Torre	Sculpture	ceramic	h= 4m, w= 3m			Q47456445	
	Bear	Tilbury Plantation, Herefordshire, UK 52.217324°N 2.5064°W			Sculpture	wood				Q47456606	

== Golden Valley ==
Image	Title / subject	Location and coordinates	Date	Artist / designer	Type	Material	Dimensions	Designation	Owner / administrator	Wikidata	Notes
	The Obelisk	Adjacent to St John Kemble Chapel and Doctors' Surgery, Ewyas Harold 51.9522533°N 2.8907934°W	2010	Graeme Mitcheson	sculpture	sandstone	h=1.5m, w=1m, d=1m			Q47471919	8 Village Artmakers Project Pieces Unveild, Herefordshire
	Dragon	Kings Thorn to A49, Herefordshire, UK 51.994422°N 2.733125°W		Steve Elsby	sculpture	wood				Q47472070	Details recorded by photographer

== Hereford ==
Image	Title / subject	Location and coordinates	Date	Artist / designer	Type	Material	Dimensions	Designation	Owner / administrator	Wikidata	Notes
	h.Apple	The County Hospital, Hereford 52.05824°N 2.70553°W	2004	Ian Berrill	sculpture	Steel				Q47472238	Commissioned as part of h.Art Herefordshire Art Week 2004 according to the plaque adjacent to the sculpture
	3d Map of Hereford	Hereford Cathedral 52.055432°N 2.70553°W			relief map					Q47472317	
More images	The Woodpecker	Whitecross Road 52.05711°N 2.72477°W	1969	Walenty Pytel	sculpture					Q47472347	Relocated in 2011
	Kingfisher with Minnow	Whitecross Road HR4 0AG	2019	Walenty Pytel	Sculpture	Galvanized Steel					Kingfisher and minnow to commemorate 50 years since Sir Peter Scott unveiled Walenty’s woodpecker commissioned by Bulmer’s Cider. Venue The Cider Museum.
More images	Sir George Cornewall Lewis	Shire Hall, Hereford 52.05612°N 2.71314°W	1864	Carlo Marochetti	statue on pedestal					Q47472418	
	Edward Elgar	Hereford Cathedral 52.05658°N 2.71502°W	2005	Jemma Pearson	statue	Bronze				Q47472878	
	Eign Gate	All Saints Church, Hereford 52.05645°N 2.71760°W	2006	Adam Greenwell	statue	Steel	h= 6m			Q47473218	
	Dan the bulldog	Bishops Meadows, Hereford 52.01266°N 2.6012°W	2002	John Tasker	sculpture	wood				Q47474338	
More images	4 Runner	Royal National College for the Blind		Walenty Pytel		Steel					Futuristic Runner
	Not known	Royal National College for the Blind 52.056807°N 2.70614°W			sculpture	wood			Royal National College for the Blind	Q47476767	
	Violette Szabo, Josie Pearson and Edward Elgar	Hereford Greenway 52.0627°N 2.70306°W	2013		sculpture	metal				Q47476804	
	A Fish’s Eye View	King George’s Playing Field 52.05090°N 2.71292°W	2006	Chris Brammall	sculpture	metal				Q47477683	
	Rotherwas Women	Holme Lacey Road, Hereford 52.05378°N 2.6846°W	2006	Bruce Williams	sculpture	sandblasted granite and steel				Q47478052	Three works featuring Nora Foster, Debbie Gittoes and Sophie Dillon respectively
	A Thousand Ghosts	King George V Playing Fields, Hereford 52.04917°N 2.71157°W	2009	Mariele Neudecker	sculpture	Wood, paint & steel				Q47478281	Commissioned by Meadow Arts
	Special Air Service memorial	Stadlestone Circle (site of a previous SAS camp)				Fibreglass				Q47478437	
	Hereford Bull	High Town Hereford 52.05649°N 2.7149°W	2012	Brian Alabaster	Sculpture	Bronze				Q47478641	
	Sunflower	Franklin House, Hereford 52.057979°N 2.712284°W	1964	Trevor Worton	sculpture	iron				Q58838746	
	Aspects of Hereford Cathedral	Cathedral Close, Hereford 52.054547°N 2.715292°W	2011		roundels	bronze				Q58838931	
	Jesus Christ the Apple Tree	Cathedral Close, Hereford 52.054347°N 2.717042°W	2011	Canon Sandy Elliot	mosaic	stone				Q58838743	
		Hereford County Hospital 52.05765°N 2.708669°W	2018	Paul Caton	sculpture	wood			Wye Valley NHS Trust	Q58839335	
	Allan Leonard Lewis	The Old Market, Hereford 52.058525°N 2.716303°W	2018	Jemma Pearson	sculpture	bronze				Q61743798	
	Swans	Riverside Courtyard of the Old General Hospital, Wye St, HR1 2NP		Walenty Pytel	Sculpture	Galvanized Steel					
	King Offa	Bewell Street, Hereford 52.056897°N 2.719717°W			sculpture					Q61743838	
More images	Game Birds and Fish	Balcony Gwynne St HR4 9DG		Walenty Pytel		Galvanized Steel					
	Ascari	Ascari Hereford		Walenty Pytel							
	Cat	Campbell Road, Hereford 52.068631°N 2.703656°W			sculpture					Q63167775	
	Forever Flowers (Shifting Borders)	Eign Gate Underpass 52.056425°N 2.720361°W	2024	Graphic Rewilding	mural					Q130396529	Commissioned as part of the "Art + People + Place" programme
	Cattles and Apples	Herdsman Pub, Widemarsh St 52.058477°N 2.715423°W	2024	Curtis Hylton	mural					Q130397303	Commissioned as part of the "Art + People + Place" programme
	Our Wild Heart	Bastion Mews 52.057401°N 2.712207°W	2024	Emmeline North	mural					Q130397316	Commissioned as part of the "Art + People + Place" programme
	Forget Me Not	Butchers Passage 52.057345°N 2.713915°W	2024	SNIK	mural					Q130397503	Commissioned as part of the "Art + People + Place" programme
	The People's Patch	Capuchin Lane 52.056293°N 2.716085°W	2024	Dermot Clarke	mural					Q130418983	Commissioned as part of the "Art + People + Place" programme
	Tom	Booth Hall Passage 52.056260°N 2.714948°W	2024	Gemma Flowers	mural						Commissioned as part of the "Art + People + Place" programme
	Every Corner Holds a Memory	Union Passage 52.057009°N 2.713280°W	2024	Estee Angeline	mural					Q130419079	Commissioned as part of the "Art + People + Place" programme

== Kington and district ==
Image	Title / subject	Location and coordinates	Date	Artist / designer	Type	Material	Dimensions	Designation	Owner / administrator	Wikidata	Notes
	British birds	Wapley Hill 52.254469°N 2.95958°W			Carved bench	wood				Q59348933	Bench a gift from friends of Miles Baddeley

== Ledbury and district ==
Image	Title / subject	Location and coordinates	Date	Artist / designer	Type	Material	Dimensions	Designation	Owner / administrator	Wikidata	Notes
	Swallows Return	Ledbury 52.028899°N 2.416805°W	2016	Walenty Pytel	Sculpture	Galvanized Steel				Q59348946	
	The people associated with the Master's House, St Katherine's Hospital	Ledbury 52.036439°N 2.423425°W			Sculpture	Stone				Q59349159	
	Garden fountain of water birds	Canwood Gallery, Checkley, HR1 4NF	1970s	Walenty Pytel		Welded Steel					A welded steel garden fountain of water birds.

== Leominster and district ==
Image	Title / subject	Location and coordinates	Date	Artist / designer	Type	Material	Dimensions	Designation	Owner / administrator	Wikidata	Notes
	Bullocks	Adjacent to Doctors' Surgery, Brockington Rd, Bodenham 52.1545331°N 2.6703266°W	2010	Graeme Mitcheson	sculpture	sandstone	h 800mm, w 1500mm, d 1000mm			Q59357553	8 Village Artmakers Project Pieces Unveild, Herefordshire
	Orchards	Corn St, Leominster 52.226906°N 2.738839°W	2014	Jericho Aceron & Ryan Midgeley	mural	painting				Q59357989	Special thanks given to Leominster Town Cadets, Earl Mortimer College, Leominster in Bloom, Roger Midgeley
	Various	Corn Square, Leominster 52.227036°N 2.737989°W	2006 (approx		clock	various				Q59358151	The 'ducking stool' is a reference to Jenny Pipes
	Laundry	Butcher Row, Leominster 52.227092°N 2.738647°W	2017		sculpture					Q59358344	Part of Leominster in Bloom
	Gardening	The Grange, Leominster 52.05824°N 2.70553°W	2006		sculpture					Q59358459	Part of Leominster in Bloom
	Building	High Street, Leominster 52.228353°N 2.735531°W	2010		sculpture	metal				Q59358511	Depicts Grange Court at its original location in Leominster.
	Leominster	Morris Mews, Leominster 52.227894°N 2.738681°W			photograph					Q59358879	
	Drapery	Drapers Lane, Leominster 52.227172°N 2.738264°W			gate	metal				Q59386426	
	Kingfisher	Pinsley Road, Leominster 52.228714°N 2.733136°W		Walenty Pytel	Sculpture	metal				Q59386469	Kingfisher arch (not gate) entrance to wildflower meadow in the Grange grounds unveiled by Monty Don.
	The Gruffalo Trail	Queen's Wood Country Park, Herefordshire 52.159847°N 2.7284477°W	2014	Steve Elsby	sculpture	wood				Q59349307	
More images	Lemster Ore and Ryeland sheep	Opposite Leominster Fire Station on Arkwright Close 52.22971°N 2.73891°W	2013	Artist Metalsmiths Claudia Petley and Paul Shepherd	sculpture	Steel					This sculpture represents a Ryeland sheep. A breed with huge influence on the history of Leominster. The breed was so highly valued during the 16th century that it was known as 'Lemster Ore': Leominster Gold.

== Ross-on-Wye and district ==
Image	Title / subject	Location and coordinates	Date	Artist / designer	Type	Material	Dimensions	Designation	Owner / administrator	Wikidata	Notes
	Leaping Salmon	outside the Man of Ross pub, Wye Street 51.914741°N 2.586163°W		Walenty Pytel	Sculpture	Galvanized Steel				Q59558602	
	Swans in Flight	Riverside Walk 51.916120°N 2.587329°W		Walenty Pytel	Sculpture	Galvanized Steel				Q59558607	
	Ducks in Flight	Riverside Walk		Walenty Pytel	Sculpture	Galvanized Steel					
	Cormorants	near South Herefordshre Golf Club 51.928156°N 2.512881°W		Walenty Pytel	Sculpture	metal				Q59562241	
	Bird Mounted on Turbine	near South Herefordshre Golf Club		Walenty Pytel							Bird on abstract base on turbine overlooking the lake.
	Abstract Vulture on Column	near South Herefordshre Golf Club		Walenty Pytel							A welded steel sculpture of a vulture on a steel column. A Garden sculpture
	Wildlife	Symonds Yat East, Herefordshire 51.84011°N 2.6375°W			Sculpture	wood				Q59562580	
More images	Stag's Head	Symonds Yat East		Walenty Pytel	Sculpture	Galvanized Steel					Welded steel Stag's heads. The pair were commissioned for a county house's gate posts in England another is in England and the fourth is now in the South of Spain.
	Gate Post Armorial Bust Lion Walenty Pytel	Symonds Yat East	1980	Walenty Pytel	Sculpture	Galvanized Steel					
More images	Gate Post Sculpture Stag's Head by Walenty Pytel	Symonds Yat East	1980	Walenty Pytel	Sculpture	Galvanized Steel					
	Tom Spring	Fownhope, Herefordshire 52.05245°N 2.71232°W			monument	stone				Q47473918	
	Core of the Community Apples	Fownhope Medical Centre HR1 4PZ 52.0067649°N 2.6117739°W		Walenty Pytel	mural	Galvanised Steel				Q61743820	

== Weobley ==
Image	Title / subject	Location and coordinates	Date	Artist / designer	Type	Material	Dimensions	Designation	Owner / administrator	Wikidata	Notes
More images	Magpie	Broad Street, Weobley 52.1592°N 2.8749°W	2000	Walenty Pytel	Sculpture	metal				Q59562936	Commissioned after the village won the Calor Gas/Daily Telegraph Great Britain Village of the Year in 1999.
	Sheep	St Mary the Virgin, Pembridge, Herefordshire 52.219102°N 2.896202°W			Sculpture	metal					
