= Jubilee Fountain =

Fountain in London, England

Coordinates: 51.500531°N 0.125166°W

- The Jubilee Fountain with Big Ben behind
- Artist: Walenty Pytel
- Year: 1977
- Medium: Galvanised steel
- Subject: Commonwealth beasts topped with a gilt crown
- Dimensions: 7.9 m (26 ft)
- Location: New Palace Yard, Westminster, London

The Jubilee Fountain is a fountain in New Palace Yard outside the British Houses of Parliament. It was erected to commemorate the Silver Jubilee of Elizabeth II.

== History and Description ==
The fountain was proposed by MPs Robert Cooke and Colin Shepherd to commemorate the Silver Jubilee of Elizabeth II. Polish-born sculptor Walenty Pytel was a constituent of Shepherd and was chosen to produce the work.

New Palace Yard was chosen as the location for the fountain, underneath which had recently seen the construction of a car park which unearthed the base of a fountain from 1443 built under Henry VI. This used the conduit of an even even older fountain and stood until the late 17th century. In February 1977 the Royal Fine Art Commission approved the maquette while construction of the fountain was already underway but were critical of its design. The maquette was put on display in the Upper Waiting Hall of the House of Commons in March, and on the 4th of May 1977, the Queen unveiled the fountain.

The fountain is of galvanised steel and features a design of the "Commonwealth Beasts", six animals representing six continents. Europe is represented by a unicorn, Africa by a lion, America by an eagle, Asia by a tiger, Australia by a kangaroo and Antarctica by a penguin. The fountain is surmounted by a sculpture of a gilt crown.
