= Meadow Arts =

Meadow Arts is a contemporary visual arts organisation and registered charity based in Shropshire, in the UK.

== Organisation ==
Meadow Arts has been in operation since 2004. The organisation exhibits new art works in the rural West Midlands where art otherwise would not be seen. Meadow Arts does not operate its own art venue but presents all of its exhibitions in partner venues, working extensively with the National Trust in recent years as part of the Trust New Art programme. The director of Meadow Arts is Anne De Charmant.

Meadow Arts became a National Portfolio Organisation of Arts Council England in Spring 2011. Funding and status was extended in July 2014.

In 2014 the Arts & Heritage organisation published a case study based on Meadow Arts' House of Beasts exhibition at Attingham Park.

== See also ==
- List of public art in Herefordshire
