= New Palace Yard =

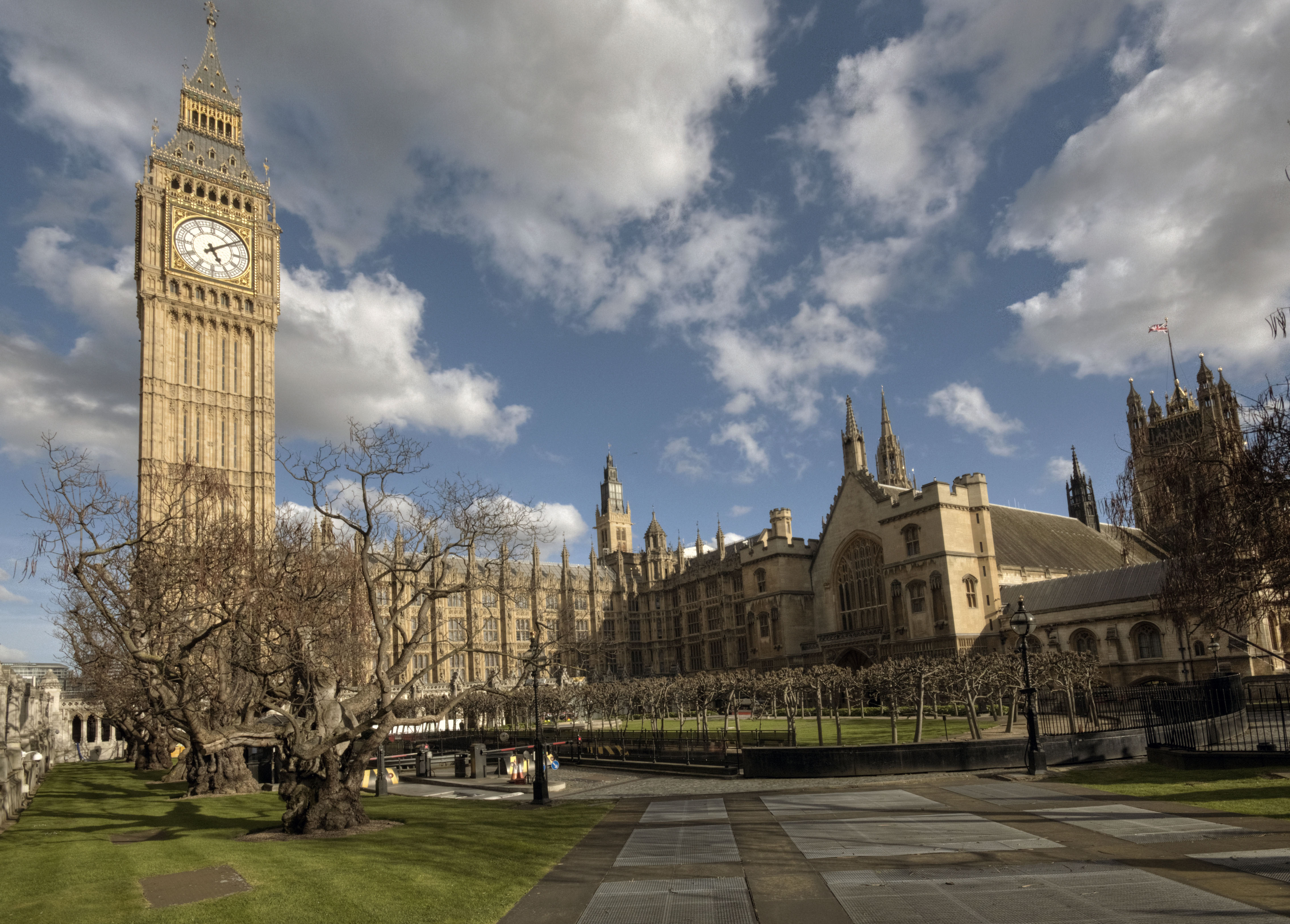
- View of New Palace Yard in 2017, looking south-east

- Location within Greater London
- 51.5005°N 0.1254°W
- Type: Open courtyard
- Location: Westminster, London, England

History
- Built: circa 1100

Site notes
- Area: Palace of Westminster
- Governing body: Parliament of the United Kingdom

New Palace Yard is a yard (area of grounds) northwest of the Palace of Westminster in Westminster, London, England. It is part of the grounds not open to the public. However, it can be viewed from the two adjoining streets, as a result of Edward Middleton Barry, who also assisted with its landscaping, having used railings rather than walls or fencing in its design. The yard has existed since about the year 1100, but was greatly reduced in the 18th century to allow for the construction of new streets and buildings, the most notable of which is the wing taking up the eastern end and having the most prominent tower of the current palace. Speaker's Green fronts the Thames. An underground car park used by Members of Parliament is beneath. Before latest incarnations of the palace, the yard was an open public space used diversely such as for speeches, tournaments, pilloryings, and executions. It has twice been the scene of terrorist attacks.

== Location ==
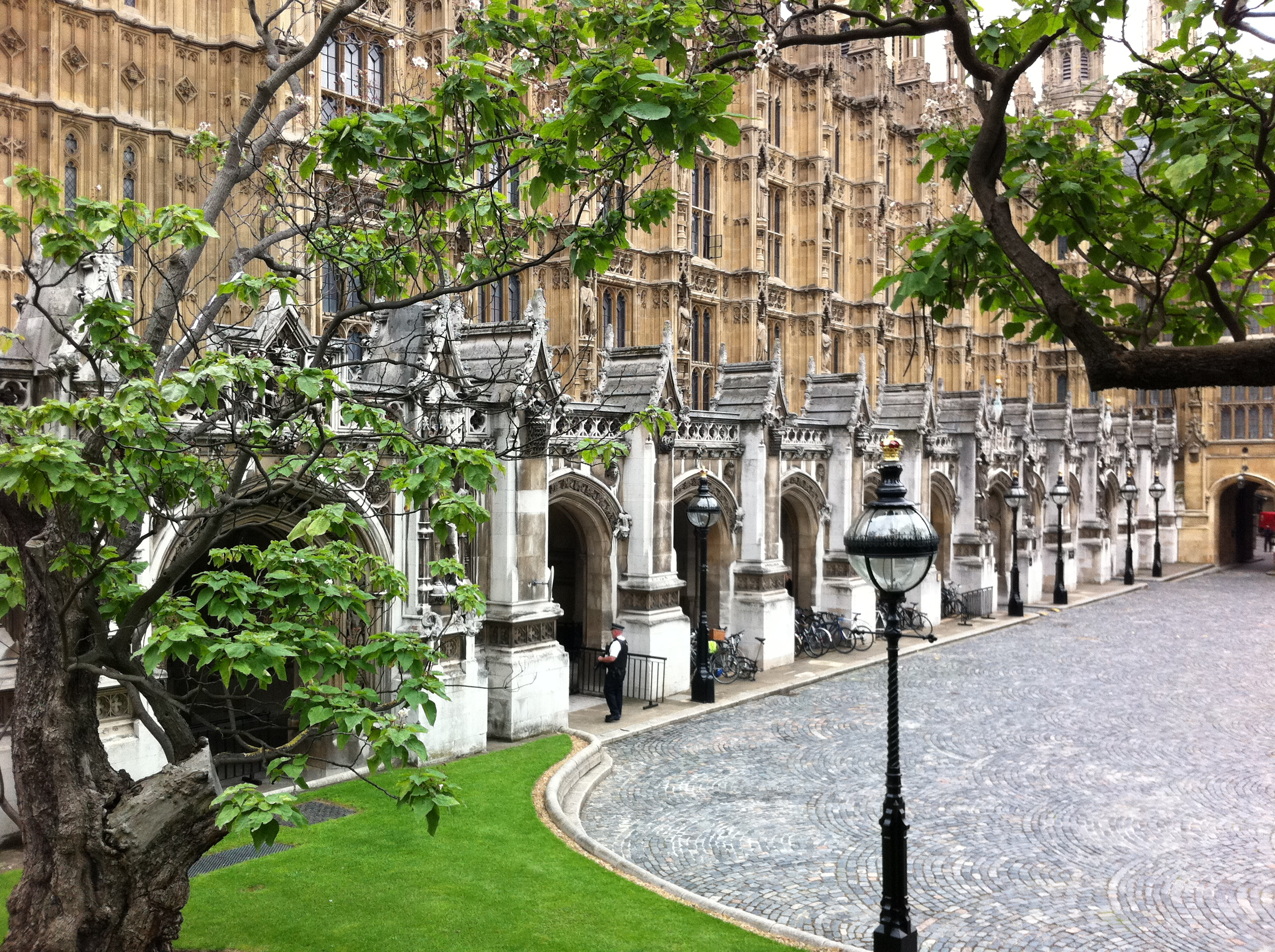
The colonnade along the east side of New Palace Yard

New Palace Yard takes up the north-west corner of the grounds of the Palace of Westminster. It is bordered to the north by Bridge Street, to the east by the Palace's North Front and Big Ben, to the south by Westminster Hall and to the west by Parliament Square. It is accessed from Parliament Square via the Carriage Gates. Underneath the yard is a five-level underground car park with 450 spaces for the cars of Members of Parliament, which was built in the 1970s. Westminster Hall's north end is accessed via the yard, which is also the site of the Members' Entrance to the House of Commons. A public arcade along the Westminster Bridge side of Speaker's Green descends to a walkway under Bridge Street connecting Westminster tube station and Westminster Pier beneath the Victoria Embankment.

== Description ==
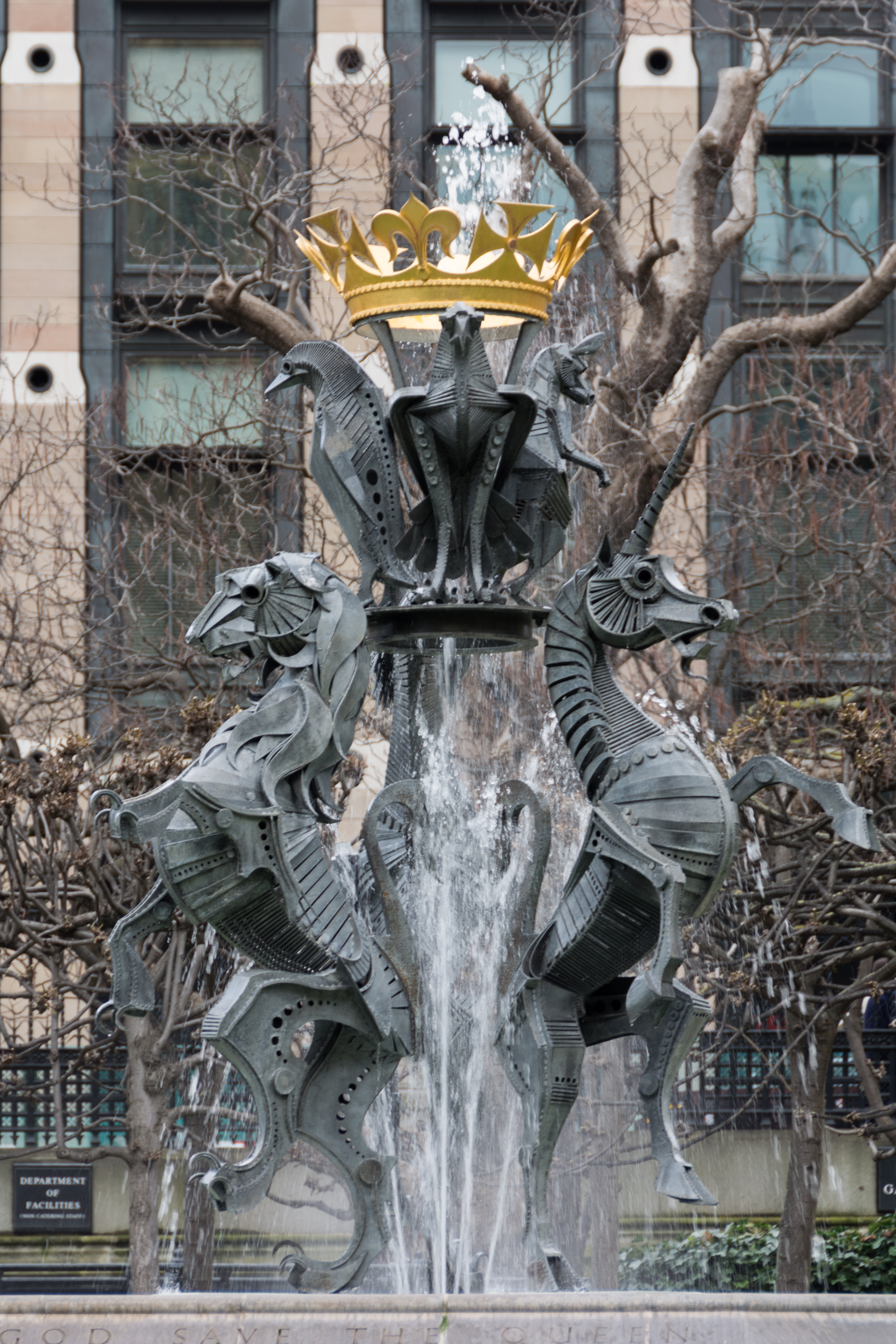
The Jubilee Fountain in New Palace Yard

The yard is laid out as a garden with a formal avenue of lime trees, benches of Portland stone and a central lawn surrounded by an oval roadway. Around the outside are a number of old catalpa trees. A fountain in the central lawn was installed in 1977 to commemorate the Silver Jubilee of Elizabeth II and recalls the lost medieval fountain of Henry VI. The fountain stands in an octagonal pool in the centre of which is a large welded steel sculpture by Walenty Pytel. The sculpture is decorated with depictions of birds and beasts from six continents and is surmounted by a gilded crown.

== History ==
The name of New Palace Yard refers to the first Palace of Westminster, built by the Anglo-Saxon king Edward the Confessor around 1050. The yard was created after William II of England constructed Westminster Hall in 1097 and was given the appellation "New" to distinguish it from Old Palace Yard a few hundred metres further south. For several hundred years, it was probably a patch of low-lying open marshy ground or perhaps even an inlet, prone to flooding up to very recent times. A rapid increase in the level of the Thames necessitated the construction of a river wall on the yard's eastern side in the 12th century. It was reclaimed by laying down cobbles on successive layers of debris that had accumulated over the years and was laid out as an open space by the late thirteenth or early fourteenth century. Thereafter, as Westminster grew, the yard came to be surrounded by buildings and walls.

The yard's function in relation to the Palace of Westminster was similar to that of an outer bailey in a castle. It was one of three yards in the palace: New Palace Yard was the outer ward, a large open space which the general populace could access; the Green Yard was the middle ward, where the royal administration and the great offices of state were located; and Old Palace Yard was the inner ward, where the royal apartments were located.

The interior of the yard was dominated for centuries by a large cupola-topped fountain built by Henry VI in 1443, which stood until the late 17th century. According to the 16th-century historian John Stow, the fountain, which was known as the Great Conduit, was made to run with wine to mark coronations and other great state events. The remains of the fountain were rediscovered in the 1970s during the construction of the underground car park.

Several executions and mutilations took place there: in 1580 the Puritan attorney John Stubbs and his servant William Page both had their hands cut off as punishment for libelling Queen Elizabeth I, while in 1612 the Scottish nobleman Robert Crichton, 8th Lord Crichton of Sanquhar, was hanged in the yard for murder. Lesser criminals were publicly exposed in a pillory erected on the site. Two such were the pretender Perkin Warbeck, pilloried in 1498, and Titus Oates, pilloried there during the reign of King James II for the Popish Plot. The last person to be pilloried in the yard was John Williams, the publisher of The North Briton newspaper in 1765.

Tournaments and royal festivities were also staged there. On one occasion, when Catherine of Aragon married Arthur, Prince of Wales in 1501, a grand tournament was held in New Palace Yard. A stand was erected for the King on the south side of the yard and challengers exited Westminster Hall on horseback. They proceeded into the yard accompanied by a pageant-car which was drawn by four animals and carried a "fair young lady" on "a goodly chair of cloth of gold". Jousting is last recorded to have taken place in the yard in 1547 when Edward VI was crowned.

=== Changes to the layout of New Palace Yard ===
New Palace Yard was originally much larger than it is today. An etching by Wenceslaus Hollar, published in 1647, shows the area as an enclosed rectangle with houses flanking Westminster Hall on both sides, Henry VI's fountain and stands for coaches in the centre, a row of shops, taverns and coffee-houses on the north side and a large square gatehouse on the west side giving access to King Street, built by Henry VIII in 1532 and demolished in 1723. The gatehouse was built by Richard III and stood until 1707. A tower to the north side was built under Edward I and was demolished in 1715; it housed the bell known as Great Tom.

Many of the buildings around New Palace Yard were swept away in the 1750s by the urban redevelopment that accompanied the construction of Westminster Bridge. Bridge Street was built to the north of the yard, Parliament Street to connect the Palace with Charing Cross, and Abingdon Street to connect it with Millbank. A row of buildings separated the yard from Bridge Street until they were demolished in 1866–7, opening up the yard to public view.

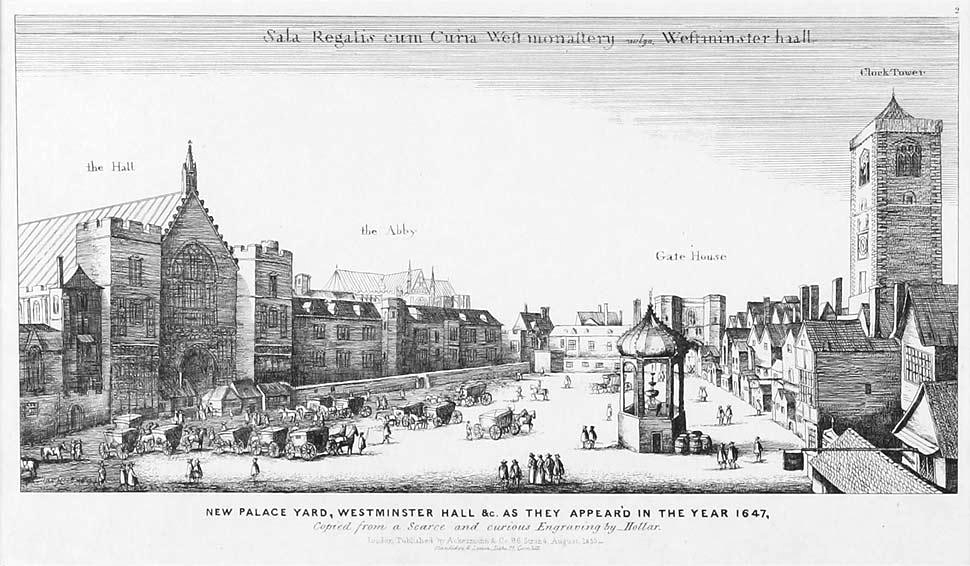
View of New Palace Yard in 1647, looking west

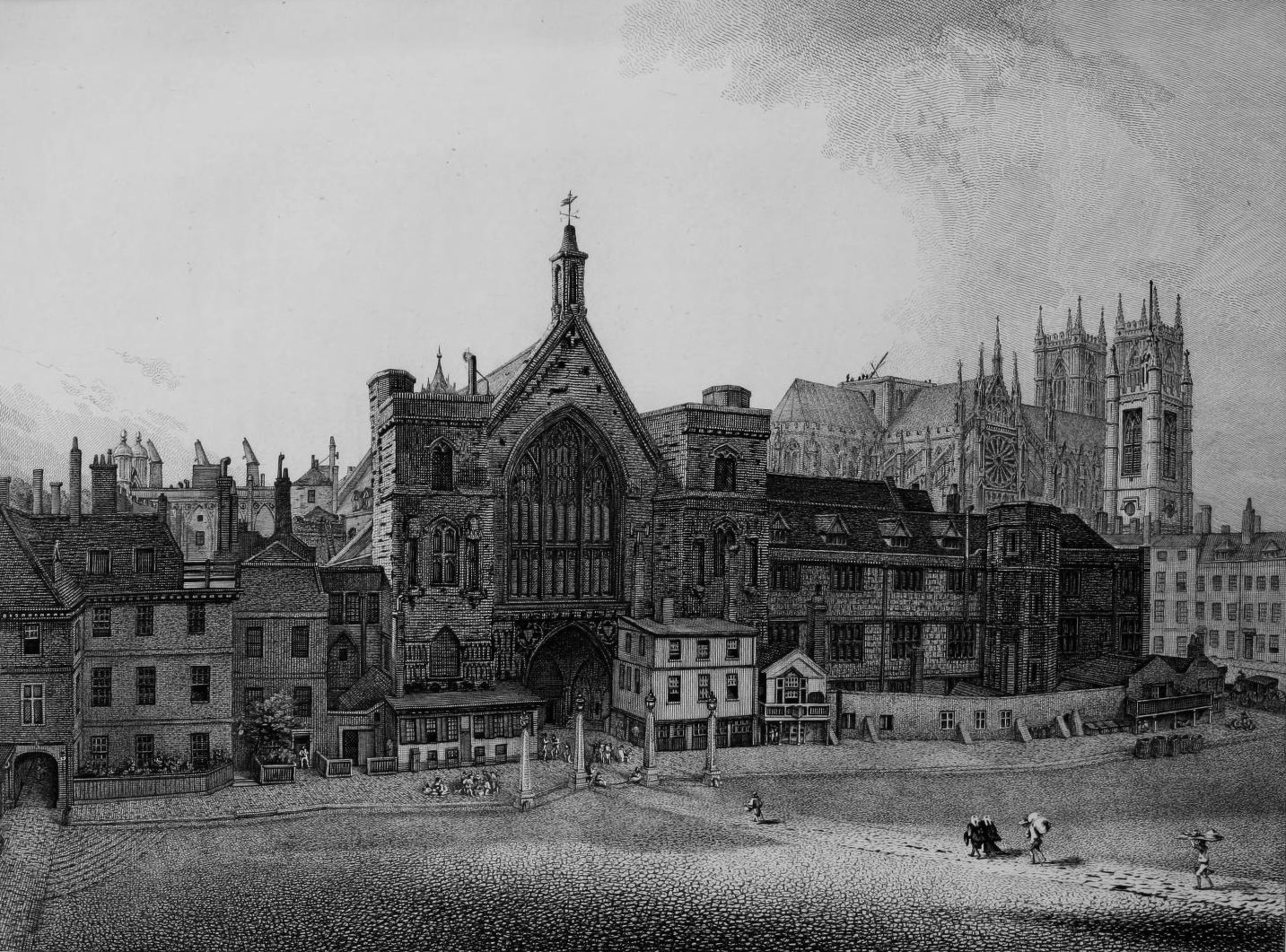
View of New Palace Yard in 1807, looking south-west

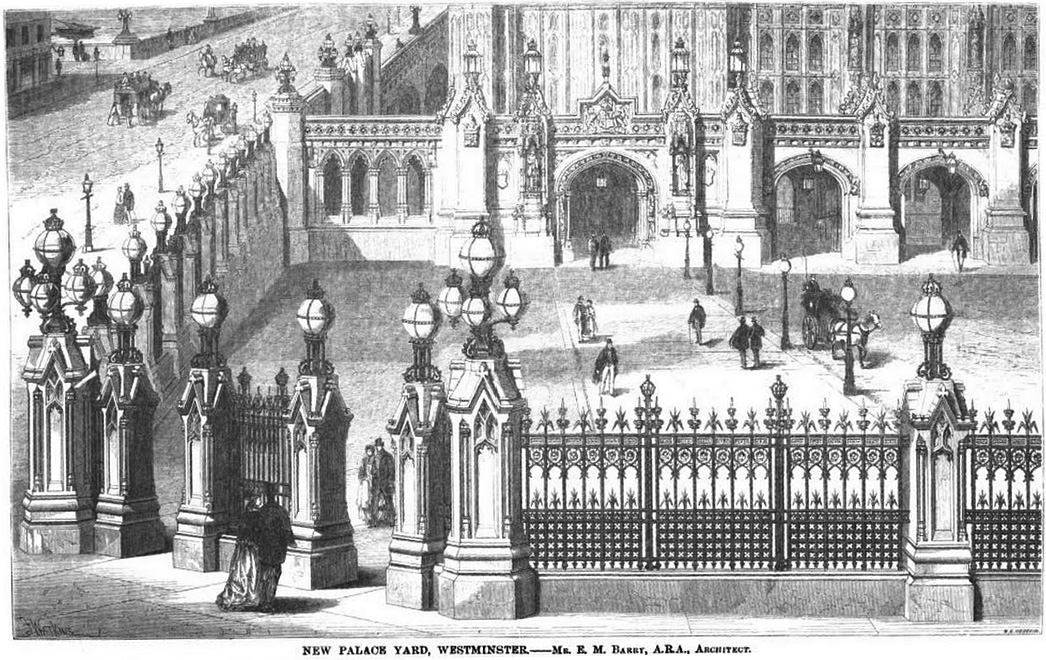
View of New Palace Yard in 1868, looking east

In the 18th and 19th centuries, the perimeter of New Palace Yard was occupied by coffeehouses and taverns. It provided a site for public meetings such as the September 1838 rally in support of the People's Charter. Public access to New Palace Yard was restricted from 1866 after a demonstration held in Hyde Park for parliamentary reform turned violent. Edward Barry was commissioned to enclose the yard with railings standing 7 feet (2.1 m) high, which were completed by February 1868. The works entailed major changes to the fabric of the yard, the surface of which was lowered by as much as 3 metres (9.8 ft) in places. The yard was occasionally opened to the public to attend public speeches by the likes of William Ewart Gladstone, but is now treated as a secure area, closed to the public.

Between 1972 and 1974, an underground car park with 450 spaces was constructed underneath the yard for £2.5 million (equivalent to £29.6 million in 2025).

== Terrorist attacks ==
New Palace Yard has twice been the scene of terrorist attacks. On 31 March 1979, an Irish National Liberation Army car bomb killed MP Airey Neave as he exited the underground car park at New Palace Yard. On 22 March 2017, an Islamic terrorist crashed a car into the perimeter fence of the Palace grounds, after driving into pedestrians on the Westminster Bridge. After abandoning the vehicle, he ran into the New Palace Yard and fatally stabbed PC Keith Palmer, an unarmed police officer guarding the Carriage Gates. His armed colleagues then shot at the terrorist who later died at the scene.

== See also ==
- Old Palace Yard
