= Walenty Pytel =

Polish-born, UK based contemporary artist (born 1941)

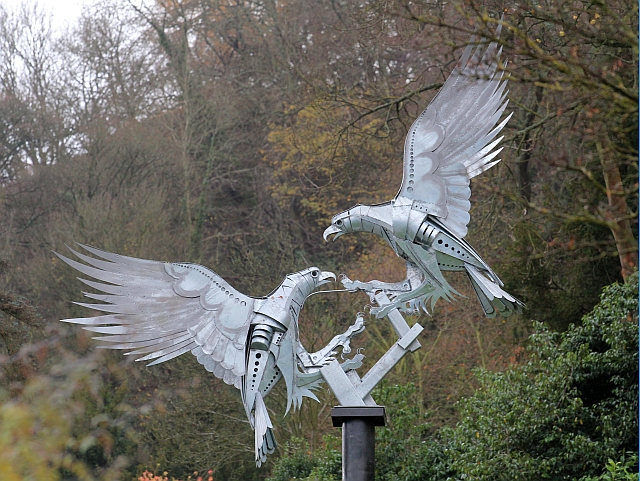
- The Diamond Jubilee sculpture (detail) in Rosebank Gardens, Great Malvern
- Born: 1941 (age 84–85); Poland
- Known for: Sculpture

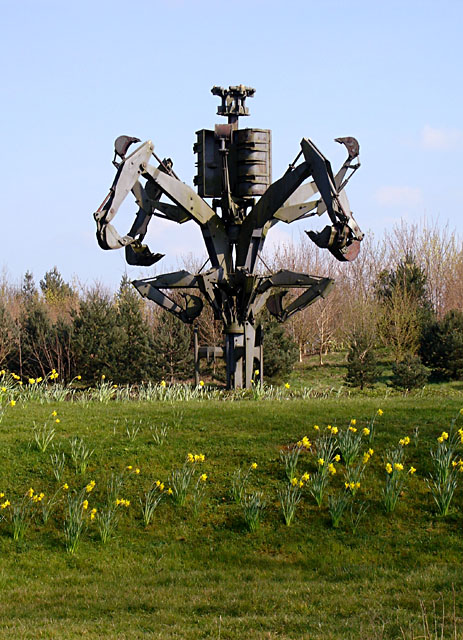
The Fossor, at the JCB headquarters in Rocester

Walenty Pytel (1941- ) is a Polish-born contemporary artist based in the United Kingdom, recognised as a leading metal sculptor of birds and beasts.

== Life ==
Pytel was born in German-occupied Poland during the Second World War. Because of his blond features, the Nazi authorities kidnapped him from his mother Jadwiga Pytel and had him adopted by a Gestapo officer and his childless wife. However his mother, who had escaped from a prison camp, snatched him from outside the couple's home and fled Poland with him to Italy.

Pytel came to England at the age of five and later studied graphic design at Hereford School of Art. After working in a publishing studio in London he opened two art studios in Hereford in 1963, initially focusing on paper sculptures for window displays but turned to metal two years later.

His creations are often inspired by nature and his artworks include the Jubilee Fountain in New Palace Yard, Westminster, a piece titled Take Off which is located at Birmingham Airport and Europe's largest (in 1979) metalwork sculpture, The Fossor, at the headquarters of JCB in Rocester, Staffordshire.

== Works ==
His first public commission came in 1965. Hereford City Council paid £100 for Christmas decorations. Three stainless-steel angels arranged in a triangle for the centre of High Town and 400 thin metal stars were erected in the city. In the wind the stars came loose and caused some damage to windows. The works have been lost.

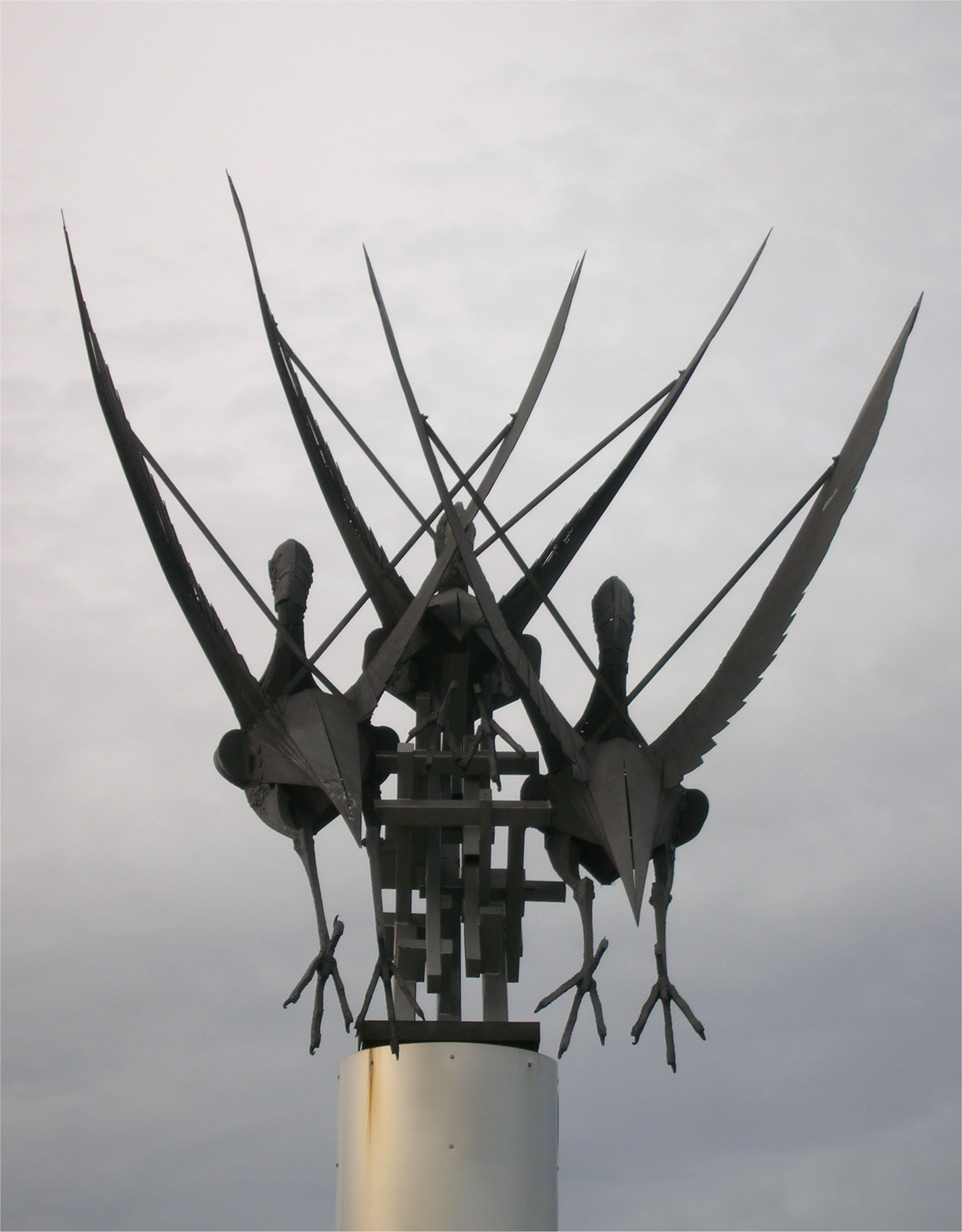
Take Off at Birmingham Airport

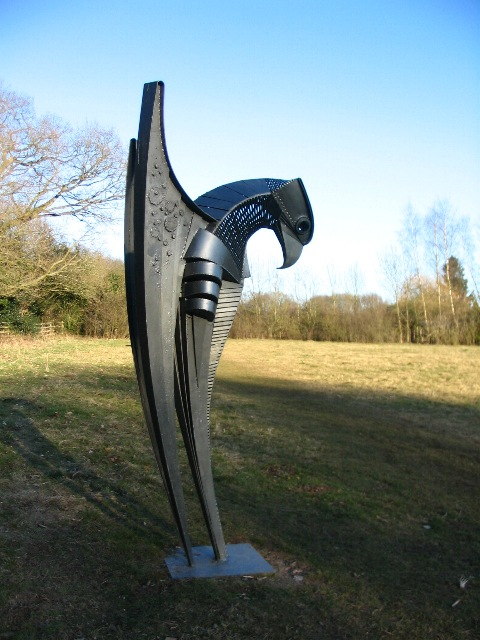
Kestrel (2000), Canley Ford

The Fossor, which takes its name from the Latin for "digger" is the most significant of the sculptures around the JCB site at Rocester. The piece is made entirely of digger parts and is a powerful representation of JCB. It weighs 36 tonnes, stands 45 feet high and was the largest steel sculpture in Europe at the time of its creation in 1979.

Take Off was erected at Birmingham Airport in 1985 and now stands on the roundabout on the approach road to the airport. The unpolished steel sculpture of three egrets was designed to commemorate forty years of peace in Europe.

Pytel has created a number of sculptures for the town of Ross-on-Wye, Herefordshire including two prominently displayed on the banks of the River Wye.

He created Ludlow's first out-of-church public war memorial, commissioned by the local Royal British Legion branch and unveiled in 2000. Some 5 metres high, situated in Ludlow Square, it consists of a cross with squat upper arms, with two doves of peace rising from near its top. In relief the front bears a sword overlying a wreath with the motto "Lest we forget" and a small plaque whose inscription concludes, "at the end of a millennium of conflict, looks forward to a millennium of peace".

In 2001 Pytel completed a sculpture of a magpie for the village of Weobley in Herefordshire (a magpie is the village's emblem). The sculpture was commissioned after the village won the Calor Gas/Daily Telegraph Great Britain Village of the Year in 1999. In 2002, he made a memorial to Colin Grazier and two colleagues involved in the capture of documents from U-559, which stands in Tamworth.

In 2005 Pytel was commissioned to create four huge steel eagles for Portuguese club Benfica, which would be displayed at their Estádio da Luz. Measuring 147 feet (45 m) from wingtip to wingtip each bird had its own specially built 150 feet (46 m) column at a corner of the stadium.

In December 2008 the Hereford Times reported that Pytel would design a sculpture for the Royal National College for the Blind in Hereford which he would create using an original drawing produced by a student at the college. At the time he was seeking inspiration to restart his career following a fall in 2006 which had resulted in a loss of memory. The piece, depicting a man running in the Futurist style and titled the 4Runner, was unveiled in September 2009 and stands on a 14 feet (4.3 m) plinth outside the entrance of the college's sports and leisure complex.

A sculpture by Pytel of two buzzards, which he has said will be his last major art-work, was installed in Rosebank Gardens, Great Malvern in November 2012. Afterwards he was persuaded to produce another sculpture for the same location called "The Lark Ascending"

An exhibition of Pytel's work, Sparks to Life, was held at Nature in Art, Gloucester, in early 2020.

== Personal life ==
Pytel married a fellow art college student. They had two children together. Although they later divorced, they continued to live together near Ross-on-Wye.
