= Statue rubbing =

Act of touching part of a public statue

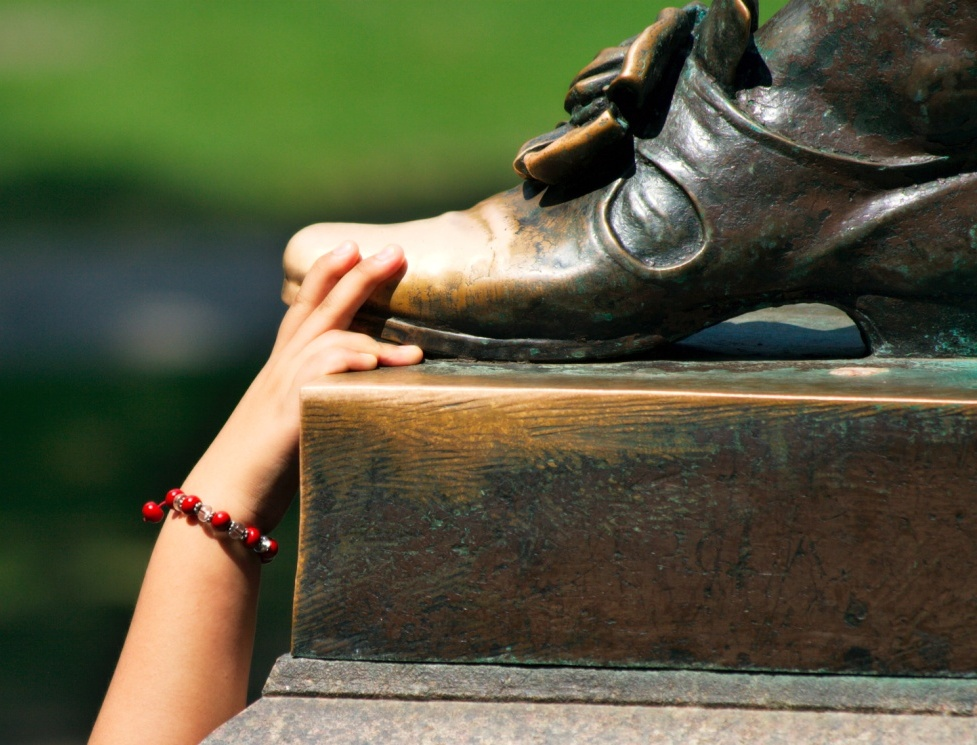
Rubbing the toes of the John Harvard statue

Statue rubbing is the act of touching a part of a public statue. Popular among tourists, it is a form of superstition that is believed to bring good luck, ensure a return to the city, improve love life or make a wish come true.

The parts that are supposed to be rubbed are usually the most protruding or characteristic ones, for example noses or feet. In Springfield, Illinois, at Lincoln's Tomb, rubbing the nose of Honest Abe's large bust is good luck. Some of those superstitions also involve touching breasts or genitalia of the person depicted on the statue – this is usually supposed to bring luck in love or improve fertility. One example is the statue of Juliet in Verona.

Rubbing statues can have negative effects on them as it causes erosion. Because of that some well-known statues had to be replaced with a replica and some places discourage or ban tourists from doing it. It is also possible to acquire a bacterial infection from touching statues.

== Notable examples ==
- Rubbing the testicles of the Charging Bull in New York for good luck
- Rubbing the snout of the Porcellino statue in Florence and putting a coin in its mouth for good luck
- Rubbing the breast of the Juliet statue in Verona to bring luck in love
- Rubbing the crotch of the Monument of Victor Noir on the Pere Lachaise Cemetery, kissing his lips and leaving flowers in his hat to improve woman's love life and fertility
- Rubbing or kissing the right foot of the Saint Peter statue in Vatican to have the prayers heard
- Rubbing the arm of Everard t'Serclaes statue in Brussels, as well as the angel's face, the dog's face and one of the shields to make a wish come true
- Rubbing the left foot of the Timothy Eaton statue in Winnipeg to bring good luck
- Rubbing the toes of the Statue of Margaret Thatcher and the Statue of Winston Churchill in the British Parliament.
- Rubbing the nose on the Bust of Abraham Lincoln (Borglum) in front of the Lincoln Tomb to bring good luck
- Rubbing the nose of the badger outside the Governor's Office in the Wisconsin Capitol Building to bring good luck
- Rubbing the nose of the statue of the loyal dog in Tolyatti by newlyweds to signify their "unbreakable fidelity".
- Gently rubbing the bear's nose of the Legends of Samogitia statue in Telšiai is said to grant wishes if they are well-intended.
- Rubbing the two plaques at the statue of St. John of Nepomuk on Charles Bridge in Prague; rubbing the dog on the left plaque is said to bring good luck, while rubbing the plaque showing St. John being thrown into the river is believed to ensure a return to Prague.
- Similarly rubbing the belly of any statue depicting Budai is said to bring good luck. This custom might have originated from the Laughing Buddha statue in the Lingyin Temple.

== Similar rituals ==
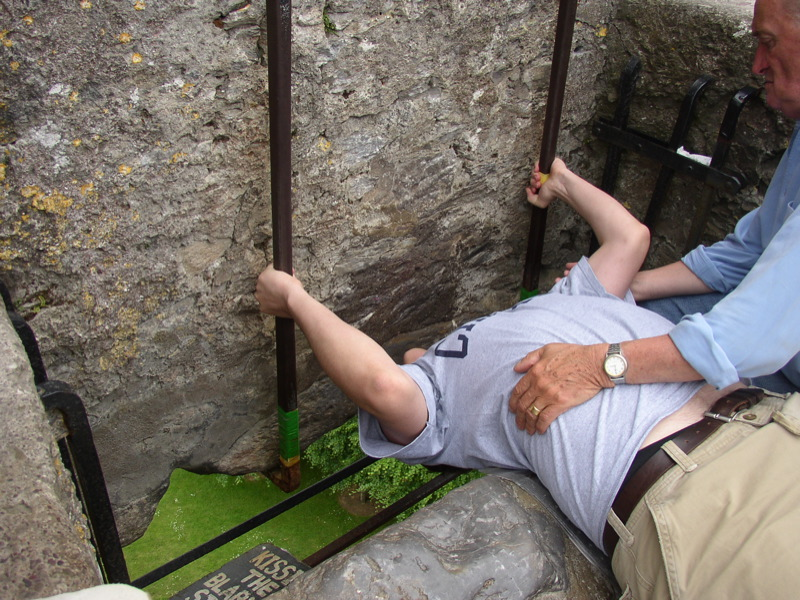
The Blarney Stone kissing ritual

- Kissing the Blarney Stone in Blarney, Ireland to endow the kisser with the gift of the gab. Because of the location of the stone it can only be done while leaning backwards, usually with a help of an assistant.
- Putting the hand inside Bocca della Verità mask in Rome which is said to work as a lie detector. Tourists make a statement while holding their hand inside the mask. If they told the truth, the hand comes unscathed, but if they lied, the mouth supposedly bites the hand off.
- Standing on top of one of the mascarons near the entrance to the Franciscan Church in Dubrovnik, taking off the shirt and putting it back on while maintaining balance to bring luck in love.

== See also ==
- Wishing well
- Love lock
