= Statue of Margaret Thatcher =

There have been three prominent statues of Margaret Thatcher:

- Statue of Margaret Thatcher (London Guildhall), 1998
- Statue of Margaret Thatcher (Palace of Westminster), 2007
- Statue of Margaret Thatcher (Grantham), 2022
