= Statue of Margaret Thatcher (London Guildhall) =

1998 marble sculpture

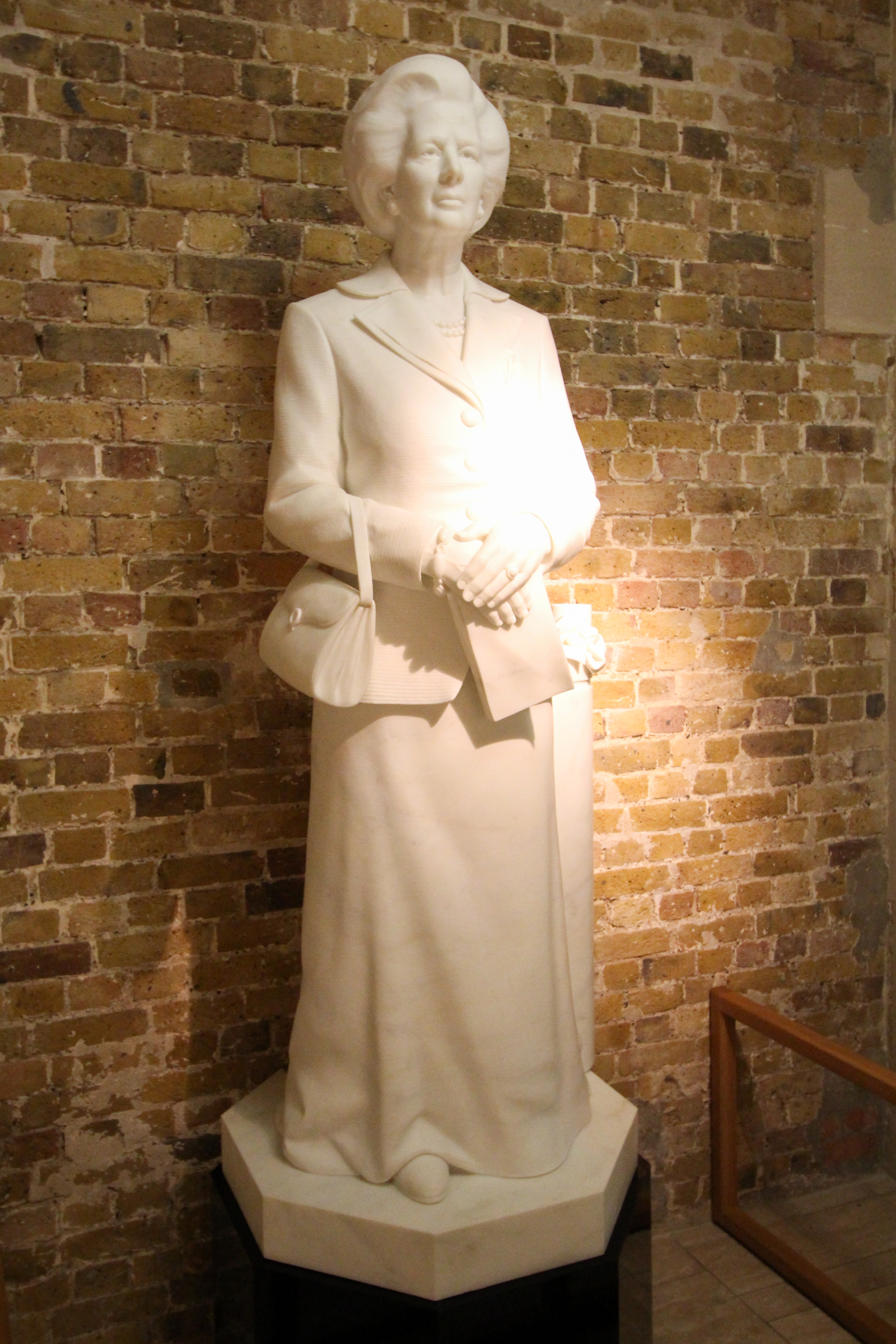
- The repaired statue in September 2015
- Artist: Neil Simmons
- Year: May 1998; 28 years ago
- Medium: Marble
- Subject: Margaret Thatcher
- Dimensions: 8-foot (2.4 m)
- Weight: 1.8-tonne (2.0-short-ton)
- Condition: rebuilt
- Location: London, EC2 United Kingdom; 51.5155664°N 0.0912595°W

The statue of Margaret Thatcher in the Guildhall, London, is a marble sculpture of the former British Prime Minister, Margaret Thatcher. It was commissioned in 1998 by the sculptor Neil Simmons by the Speaker's Advisory Committee on Works of Art; paid for by an anonymous donor, it was intended for a plinth among statues of former Prime Ministers of the United Kingdom in the Members' Lobby of the House of Commons. However, as the House did not permit a statue to be erected there during its subject's lifetime, the work had been temporarily housed in Guildhall. It was unveiled there by Lady Thatcher in February 2002.

== Decapitation ==
On 3 July 2002, theatre producer Paul Kelleher decapitated the statue while it was on display at Guildhall Art Gallery. Having unsuccessfully taken a swing at the statue with a cricket bat concealed in his trousers, Kelleher picked up a metal pole from a nearby rope cordon and used it to decapitate the £150,000 statue. After the vandalism he waited to be arrested by the police who arrived minutes later. He joked on capture: "I think it looks better like that."

Following the loss of its head, the statue was removed from display. Although it was estimated that the work could be repaired for about £10,000, statue experts expressed concern that it could never be fully restored.

At his first trial, Kelleher said in his defense that the attack involved his "artistic expression and my right to interact with this broken world". The jury, despite nearly four hours of deliberation and a direction from the judge that it could decide by the majority, failed to agree on whether or not he had "lawful excuse". He was retried in January 2003, found guilty of criminal damage and sentenced to three months in jail.

On 21 February 2007, a new statue of Thatcher was commissioned in 2003 from sculptor Antony Dufort and this time in tougher silicon bronze. It was erected on the reserved plinth in the Members' Lobby. The rule against living subjects had been relaxed by this stage and Thatcher unveiled the statue. By then, the marble statue had been repaired, but it remains in Guildhall. After several years in the Guildhall Art Gallery, the statue was moved to a corridor location elsewhere in the Guildhall building.

== In popular culture ==
- "I Did It for Alfie", a song on the 2004 album Un by Chumbawamba that was directly inspired by the incident
