= Statue of Winston Churchill, Palace of Westminster =

Statue by Oscar Nemon in London, England

Coordinates: 51°29′58.7″N 0°07′29.0″W

Winston Churchill
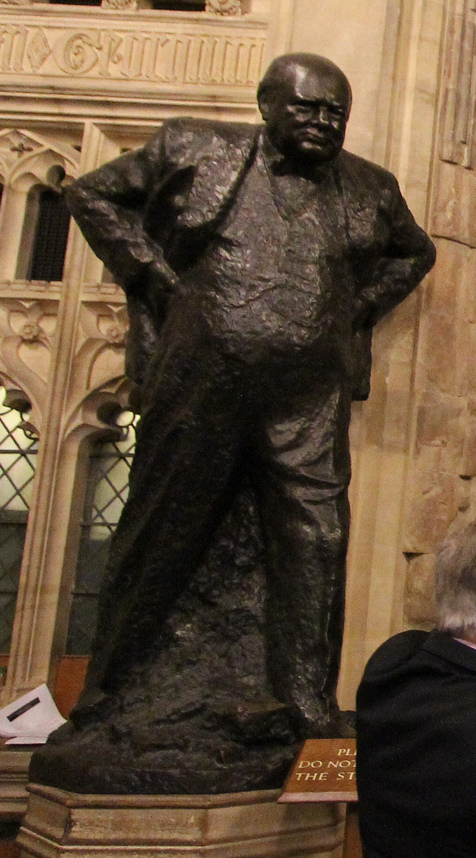
- Artist: Oscar Nemon
- Year: 1969; unveiled 1970
- Type: Bronze
- Location: Members' Lobby, Palace of Westminster, London

The statue of Winston Churchill is a standing bronze statue of statesman and writer Winston Churchill, situated in the Members' Lobby of the House of Commons of the United Kingdom, part of the Palace of Westminster complex in Westminster, Central London. Churchill is depicted mid-stride, with his hands on his hips.

Churchill and Oscar Nemon first met in Marrakesh in 1951, where Nemon sculpted a terracotta bust that Churchill's wife, Clementine, Lady Churchill said "represents to me my husband as I see him and as I think of him". In 1952, on Churchill's recommendation, Nemon made a bust of him at the request of Queen Elizabeth II for Windsor Castle. Nemon also made a seated bronze sculpture of Churchill for the City of London's Guildhall, which Churchill described as a 'very good likeness' upon its unveiling in 1955.

== See also ==
- Statue of Margaret Thatcher, Palace of Westminster
- Statue of Winston Churchill, Parliament Square
