= Source (journalism) =

Person, publication, or document that gives timely information

In journalism, a source is a person, publication, or knowledge of other record or document that gives timely information. Outside journalism, sources are sometimes known as "news sources". Examples of sources include official records, publications or broadcasts, officials in government or business, organizations or corporations, witnesses of crime, accidents or other events, and people involved with or affected by a news event or issue.

According to Shoemaker (1996) and McQuail (1994), there are a multitude of factors that tend to condition the acceptance of sources as bona fide by investigative journalists. Reporters are expected to develop and cultivate sources, especially if they regularly cover a specific topic, known as a "beat". Beat reporters must, however, be cautious of becoming too close to their sources. Reporters often, but not always, give greater leeway to sources with little experience. For example, sometimes a person will say they don't want to talk, and then proceed to talk; if that person is not a public figure, reporters are less likely to use that information. Journalists are also encouraged to be skeptical without being cynical, as per the saying "If your mother says she loves you, check it out," popularized by the City News Bureau of Chicago. As a rule of thumb, but especially when reporting on controversy, reporters are expected to use multiple sources.

== Ethical guidelines ==
=== Confidential information ===
A journalist may agree to discuss a topic "off the record". According to the Poynter Institute, if a reporter agrees to an off-the-record conversation, "the ethical thing to do is not report or even repeat that information".

Unlike a non-disclosure agreement (NDA), an agreement to talk off the record has no legal force, as it lacks one or more of the elements that make up a binding contract. However, like a non-disclosure agreement, a source may be able to use contract law to control the use of the information provided or protect their privacy.

Some journalists and news organizations have policies against accepting information "off the record" because they believe it interferes with their ability to report truthfully, or because they suspect it may be intended to mislead them or the public. Some people believe it is unethical for a source to give information off the record.

Even if writers cannot report certain information directly, they can use "off the record" information to uncover related facts, or to find other sources who are willing to speak on the record. This is especially useful in investigative journalism. Information about a surprise event or breaking news, whether on or off the record, is known as a "tip-off". Information that leads to the uncovering of more interesting information is called a "lead".

=== Anonymous source ===
The identity of anonymous sources is sometimes revealed to senior editors or a news organization's lawyers, who would be considered bound by the same confidentiality as the journalist. (Lawyers are generally protected from subpoena in these cases by attorney–client privilege.) Legal staff may need to give counsel about whether it is advisable to publish certain information, or about court proceedings that may attempt to learn confidential information. Senior editors are in the loop to prevent reporters from fabricating non-existent anonymous sources and to provide a second opinion about how to use the information obtained, how to or how not to identify sources, and whether other options should be pursued.

The use of anonymous sources has always been controversial. Some news outlets insist that anonymous sources are the only way to obtain certain information, while others prohibit the use of unnamed sources at all times. News organizations may impose safeguards, such as requiring that information from an anonymous source be corroborated by a second source before it can be printed.

Prominent reports based on anonymous sources have sometimes been proven to be incorrect. For instance, much of the O. J. Simpson reporting from unnamed sources was later deemed inaccurate. Newsweek retracted a story about a Qur'an allegedly being flushed down a toilet—the story had been based upon one unnamed military source.

One study found that large newspapers' use of anonymous sources dropped dramatically between 2003 and 2004. The Project for Excellence in Journalism, a research group, found use of anonymous sources dropped from 29 percent of all articles in 2003 to just seven percent in 2004, following widespread embarrassment of media after the Bush administration claims that Iraq had WMDs were found to be without basis.

=== Sex with sources ===
In the U.S., this practice is generally not well seen. However, lengthy lists of reporters' sexual involvement with sources were published by American Journalism Review and by the Los Angeles Times.

=== Not on tape ===
Whether in a formal, sit-down interview setting or an impromptu meeting on the street, some sources request that all or part of the encounter not be captured in an audio or video recording ("tape"), but continue speaking to the reporter. As long as the interview is not confidential, the reporter may report the information given by the source, even repeating direct quotes (perhaps scribbled on a notepad or recalled from memory). This often shows up in broadcasts as "John Brown declined to be interviewed on camera, but said" or simply "a spokesperson said".

Some interview subjects are uncomfortable being recorded. Some are afraid they will be inarticulate or feel embarrassed if the interview is broadcast. Others might be uncooperative or distrust the motives or competence of the journalist, and wish to prevent them from being able to broadcast an unflattering sound bite or part of the interview out of context. Professional public relations officers know that having the reporter repeat their words, rather than being heard directly on the air, will blunt the effect of their words. By refusing to be taped or on the air, a person avoids having an audience see or hear them being uncomfortable (if they have unpleasant news); it also permits the individual to be anonymous or identified only by title.

== Attribution ==
In journalism, attribution is the identification of the source of reported information. Journalists' ethical codes normally address the issue of attribution, which is sensitive because in the course of their work, journalists may receive information from sources who wish to remain anonymous. In investigative journalism, important news stories often depend on such information. For example, the Watergate scandal which led to the downfall of U.S. president Richard Nixon was in part exposed by information revealed by an anonymous source ("Deep Throat") to investigative reporters Bob Woodward and Carl Bernstein.

=== Ethics ===
Divulging the identity of a confidential source is frowned upon by groups representing journalists in many democracies. In many countries, journalists have no special legal status, and may be required to divulge their sources in the course of a criminal investigation, as any other citizen would be. Even in jurisdictions that grant journalists special legal protections, journalists are typically required to testify if they bear witness to a crime.

Journalists defend the use of anonymous sources for a variety of reasons:

- Access. Some sources refuse to share stories without the shield of anonymity, including many government officials.
- Protection from reprisal or punishment. Other sources are concerned about reprisal or punishment as a result of sharing information with journalists.
- Illegal activity. Sources which are engaged in illegal activity are usually reluctant to be named in order to avoid self-incrimination. This includes sources which are leaking classified information or details of court proceedings which are sealed from the public.

The use of anonymous sources is also criticized by some journalists and government officials:

- Unreliability. It is difficult for a reader to evaluate the reliability and neutrality of a source they cannot identify, and the reliability of the news as a whole is reduced when it relies upon information from anonymous sources.
- Misinformation and propaganda. Anonymous sources may be reluctant to be identified because the information they are sharing is uncertain or known to them to be untrue, but they want attention or to spread propaganda via the press, such as in the case of the Iraqi aluminum tubes, where tubes known to be useless for uranium refinement were presented as evidence of Saddam Hussein's nuclear weapons program by anonymous sources in the U.S. intelligence community in order to build public support for an attack on Iraq. It may also be used to attack political enemies and present opinions as facts. Several journalists, including Paul Carr, have argued that if an off-the-record briefing is a deliberate lie journalists should feel permitted to name the source. The Washington Post identified a source who had offered a story in an attempt to discredit media and to distract from the issue at hand with respect to a case of sexual impropriety. Whistle blower Edward Snowden posted on twitter, the 1983 Vietnam Reconsidered Conference (USC), interview of former CIA officer Frank Snepp in which he discusses how the CIA planted misinformation about the Vietnam War. Snepp's planted stories were published in major US publications including The New York Times, The New Yorker, the Los Angeles Times, and Chicago Daily News.
- Illegal activity. The use of anonymous sources encourages some sources to divulge information which it is illegal for them to divulge, such as the details of a legal settlement, grand jury testimony, or classified information. This information is illegal to disclose for reasons such as national security, protecting witnesses, preventing slander and libel, and ending lawsuits without lengthy, expensive trials and encouraging people to disclose such information defeats the purpose of the disclosure being illegal. In some cases, a reporter may encourage a source to disclose classified information, resulting in accusations of espionage.
- Fabricated sources. A journalist may fabricate a news story and ascribe the information to anonymous sources to fabricate news, create false detail for a news story, commit plagiarism, or protect themselves from accusations of libel.

=== Speaking terms ===
There are several categories of "speaking terms" (agreements concerning attribution) that cover information conveyed in conversations with journalists. In the UK the following conventions are generally accepted:

- "On the record": all that is said can be quoted and attributed.
- "Unattributable": what is said can be reported but not attributed.
- "Off the record": the information is provided to inform a decision or provide a confidential explanation, not for publication.

However, confusion over the precise meaning of "unattributable" and "off-the-record" has led to more detailed formulations:

| Designation | Description |
|---|---|
| "Chatham House Rule" | Named after Chatham House (the Royal Institute of International Affairs), which introduced the rule in 1927: "When a meeting, or part thereof, is held under the Chatham House Rule, participants are free to use the information received, but neither the identity nor the affiliation of the speaker(s), nor that of any other participant, may be revealed". |
| "Lobby terms": | In the UK accredited journalists are allowed in to the otherwise restricted Members' Lobby on the basis that information received there is never attributed and events there are not reported. "Lobby terms" are agreed to extend this arrangement to cover discussions that take place elsewhere. |
| "Not for attribution" | The comments may be quoted directly, but the source may be identified only in general terms (e.g., "a government insider" or "company spokesperson"). In practice such general descriptions may be agreed with the interviewee. |
| "On background" | The thrust of the briefing may be reported (and the source characterized in general terms as above) but direct quotes may not be used. |
| "Deep background" | A term that is used in the United States, though not consistently. Most journalists would understand "deep background" to mean that the information may not be included in the article but is used by the journalist to enhance his or her view of the subject matter, or to act as a guide to other leads or sources. Most deep background information is confirmed elsewhere before being reported. Alternative meanings exist; for instance, a White House spokesman said, "Deep background means that the info presented by the briefers can be used in reporting but the briefers can't be quoted." Deep background can also mean the information received can be used in the story, but cannot be attributed to any source. Depending on the publication, information on deep background is sometimes attributed in terms such as "[Publication name] has learned" or "It is understood by [publication name]." |

== See also ==
- Angle
- Reporters' privilege shield laws in the United States
