= Ivor Roberts-Jones =

British sculptor (1913–1996)

Ivor Roberts-Jones RA (2 November 1913 – 9 December 1996) was an English sculptor of Welsh descent on both his parents' sides. He is best known for his sculpted heads of notable people such as Yehudi Menuhin and George Thomas, Viscount Tonypandy.

He was born in Oswestry, where one of his works, The Borderland Farmer, stands in the town centre. He studied at Oswestry School and Worksop College before attending Goldsmiths College, London and the Royal Academy of Arts.

During the Second World War he served in the Burma Campaign. From 1964 he taught sculpture at Goldsmiths, University of London.

He received his first full-scale commission in 1964 for the memorial sculpture of the Bohemian British painter Augustus John (1878–1961). This sculpture took three years to complete and required major alteration (from a double sculpture of John and his wife Dorelia) due to limitation of funds. Nonetheless, the final 1967 single-figure sculpture was dramatically successful and led to Roberts-Jones's election as an Associate of the Royal Academy. This sculpture was erected in Fordingbridge, Hampshire, near John's last home.

In 1971 he was commissioned to produce the full-length statue of Winston Churchill which now stands in Parliament Square, London. The artist Kyffin Williams, a friend of Roberts-Jones, is said to have acted as the model for Churchill. The organiser of the appeal to raise money for the statue did not like its initial appearance, and reported: "At the moment the head is undoubtedly like Churchill, but perhaps not quite right of him at the pinnacle of his career. The cheeks, the eyes, the forehead and the top of the head require improvement. I told Mr Roberts-Jones that above the eyes I thought I was looking at Mussolini." The sculptor promised to "remove the dome of the head to bring about a lowering of the forehead".

Roberts-Jones's 1984 sculpture The Two Kings at Harlech Castle illustrates a scene from Welsh mythology, in which Bendigeidfran carries the body of his nephew Gwern.

In 1988, Roberts-Jones was commissioned to produce a statue of the poet Rupert Brooke at Regent Place, a small triangular open space, in Brooke's birth town of Rugby. The statue was unveiled by Mary Archer.

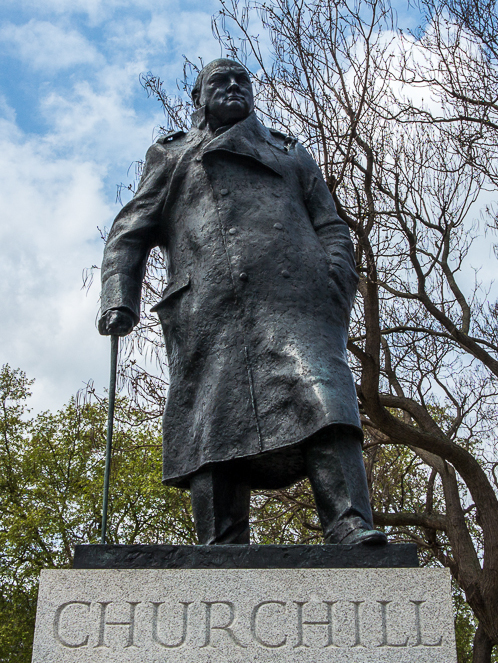
Statue of Winston Churchill, Parliament Square

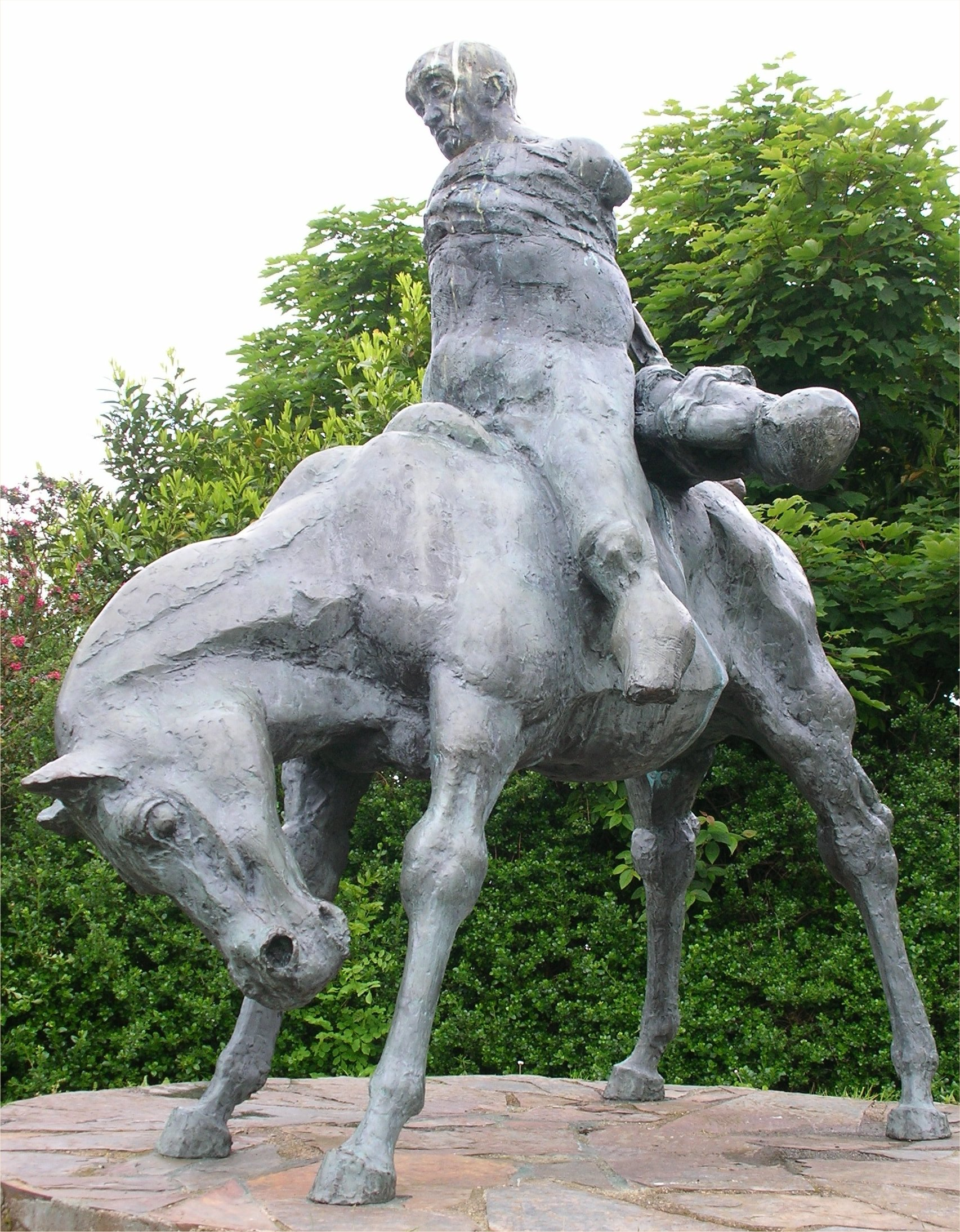
The Two Kings (from the Mabinogion), Harlech Castle

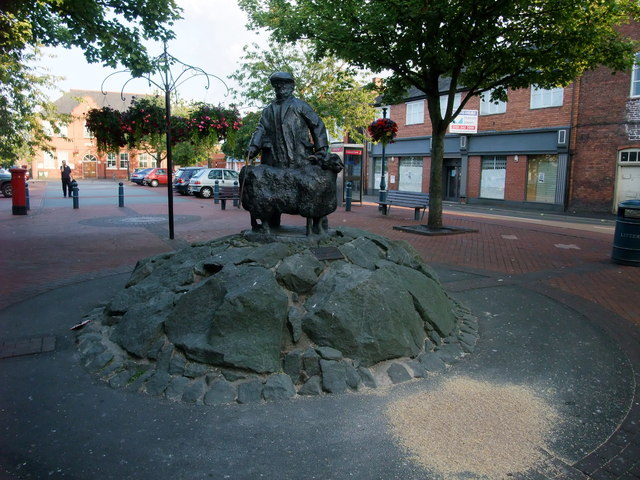
The Borderland Farmer, Oswestry

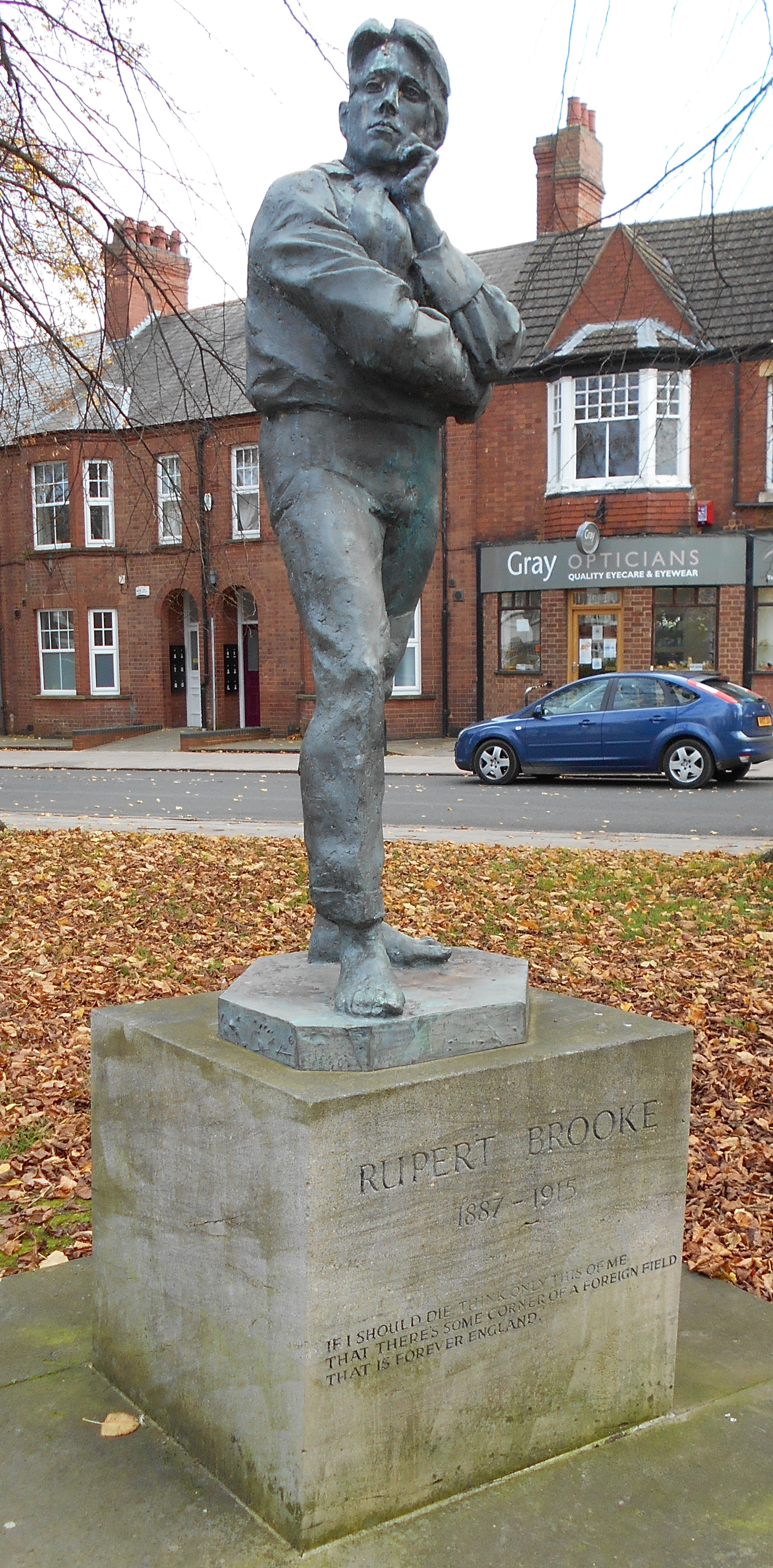
Statue of Rupert Brooke, Rugby
