= Antony Dufort =

English sculptor

Antony Dufort FRSS (born 1948) is an English artist and sculptor. His commissioned works include a statue of Margaret Thatcher and stand at various locations in Britain.

== Life ==
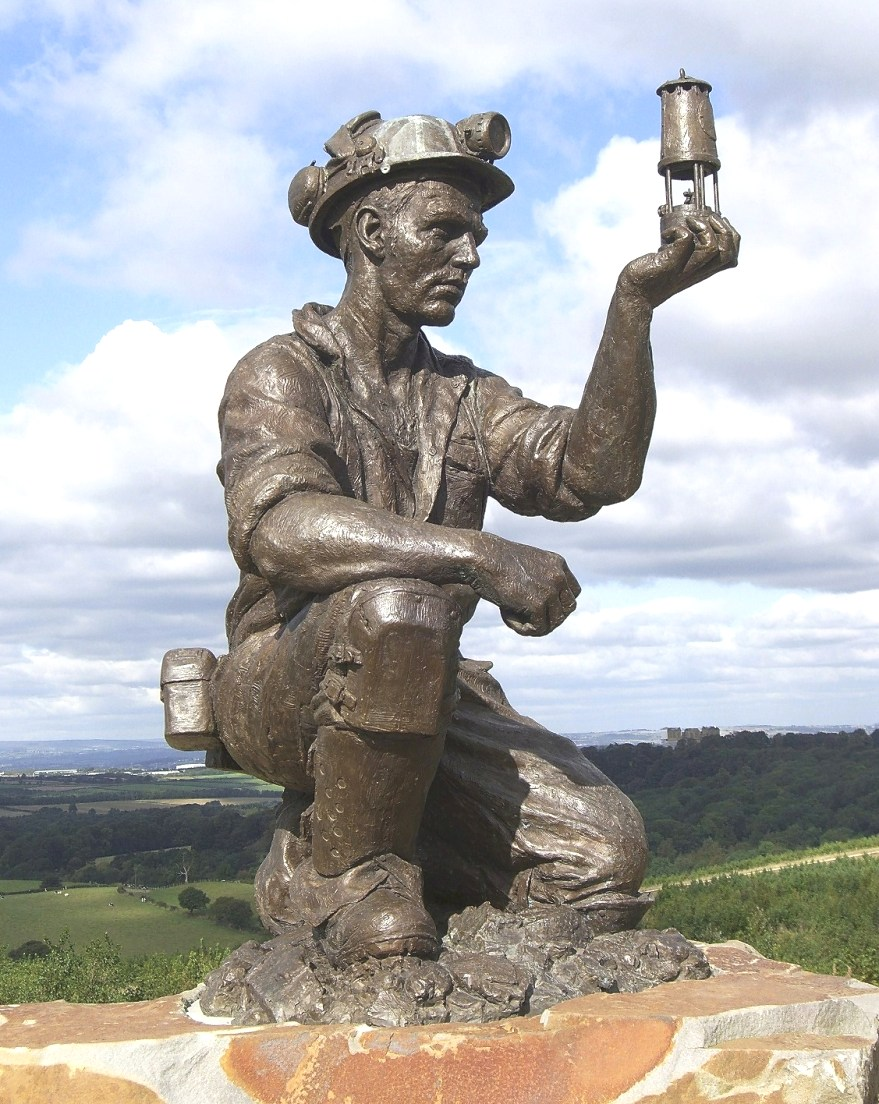
"Testing for Gas" in Silverhill Wood Country Park

Dufort's maternal grandmother Doris de Halpert, an artist who had studied under Walter Sickert, gave him lessons in drawing and painting. He studied history at New College, Oxford; at Chelsea School of Art he gained a diploma in art and design, and a master's degree in fine art, and he attended a postgraduate art teacher's course at Goldsmiths' College. After working as a film storyboard artist and illustrator, he began a career as a sculptor. He is a Fellow of the Royal Society of Sculptors, and a Council member of the Society of Portrait Sculptors.

== Works ==
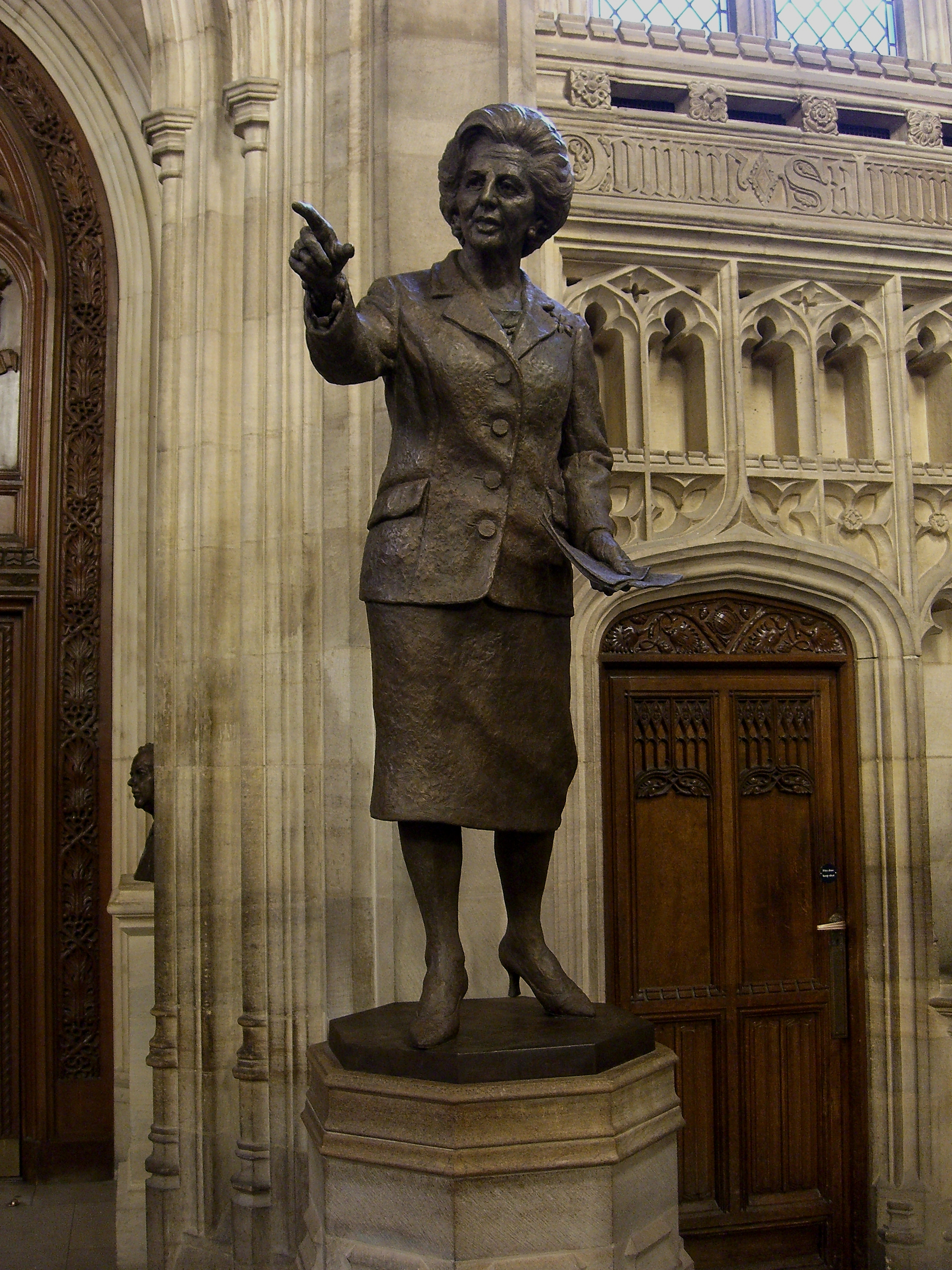
Bronze statue of Margaret Thatcher, in the Members' Lobby of the House of Commons

Dufort's works include the following:

An over-life size bronze statue of a bowler, at Lord's Cricket Ground in London, commissioned by the MCC, was unveiled in 2002.

"Testing for Gas", unveiled in 2005, is in Silverhill Wood Country Park near Sutton-in-Ashfield, Nottinghamshire. It is on high ground, a former spoil heap of Silverhill Colliery, which closed in the 1990s. The over life-size bronze statue, on a rock plinth, shows a kneeling coal miner testing for methane gas. It was commissioned by Nottinghamshire County Council to commemorate the Nottinghamshire mining industry.

Baroness Margaret Thatcher unveiled an over life-size bronze statue of herself, in the Members' Lobby of the Palace of Westminster, London, in 2007. It was commissioned by the Speaker's Advisory Committee on Works of Art.

A portrait of Britannia was created for the reverse of the £2 Coin of 2015; 650,000 coins were minted.

A frieze in high-relief, showing miners escaping from a flooded mine, was unveiled in Cinderford in the Forest of Dean in 2022. It is a memorial marking the rescue of 182 miners from Waterloo Colliery in 1949, and was commissioned by Forest of Dean District Council and Cinderford Labour Party. Dufort said: "When I came to the Forest of Dean about 40 years ago all of my neighbours were all miners or from miners' families."

A memorial to the mathematician George Boole was unveiled outside the railway station in Lincoln in 2022. It was commissioned by the Heslam Trust. Boole, born in Lincoln, is shown as a teacher with two pupils.
