= Statue of Winston Churchill, Parliament Square =

Statue by Ivor Roberts-Jones in London

Coordinates: 51.50085°N 0.12646°W

Winston Churchill
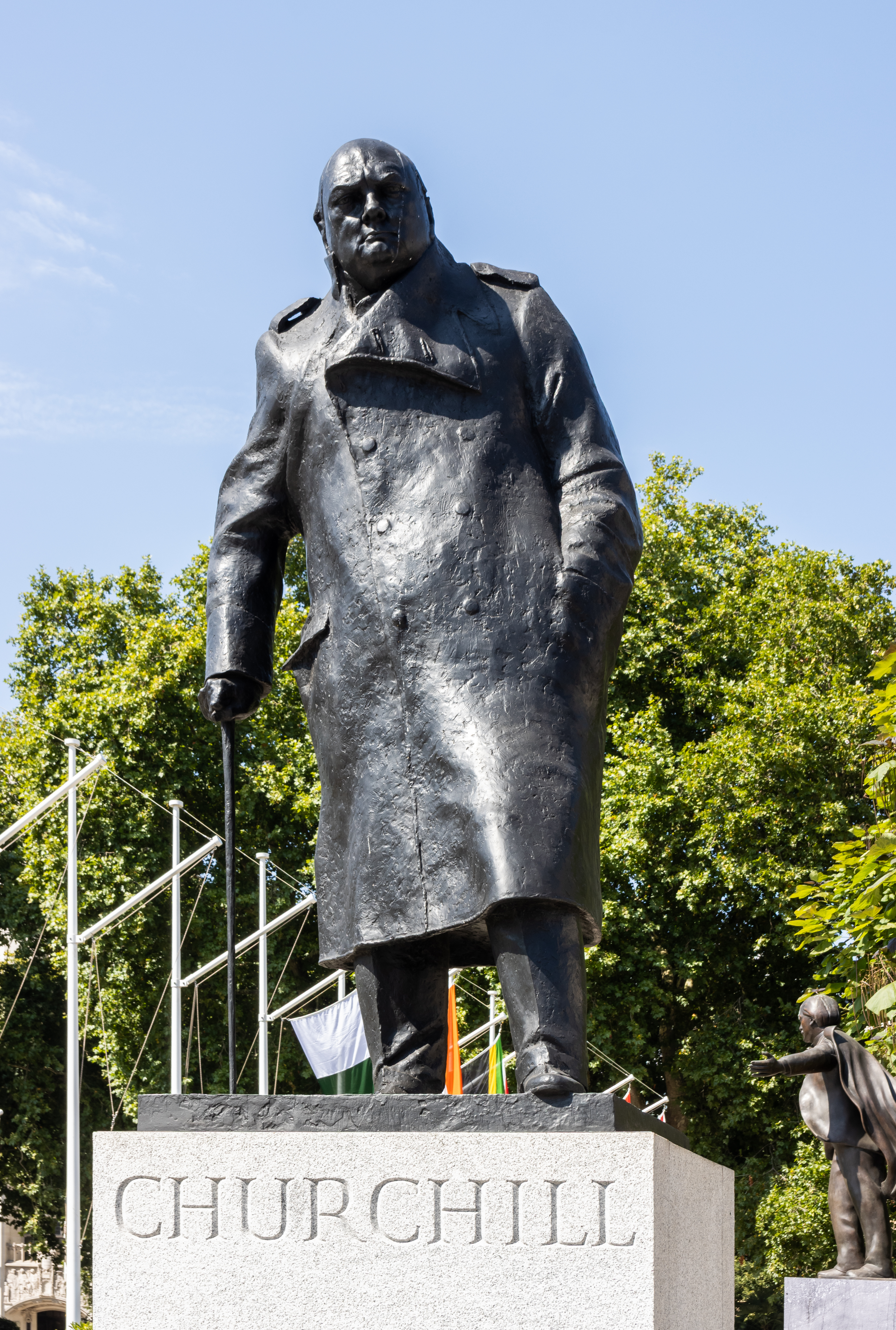
- The statue in 2025
- Artist: Ivor Roberts-Jones
- Year: 1973; 53 years ago
- Type: Bronze sculpture
- Subject: Winston Churchill
- Location: London, SW1 United Kingdom

The statue of Winston Churchill in Parliament Square, London, is a bronze sculpture of the former British prime minister Winston Churchill, created by Ivor Roberts-Jones.

It is located on a spot referred to in the 1950s by Churchill as "where my statue will go". It was unveiled in 1973 by his widow Clementine, Baroness Spencer-Churchill, at a ceremony attended by the serving prime minister and four former prime ministers, while Queen Elizabeth II gave a speech.

The statue is one of twelve statues on or around Parliament Square, most of well-known statesmen.

== Description ==
The statue is 12 feet (3.7 m) high and is made of bronze. It was sculpted by Ivor Roberts-Jones and is located on the main green of Parliament Square, opposite the Palace of Westminster. The artist Kyffin Williams, a friend of Roberts-Jones, is said to have acted as the model for Churchill.

The statue shows Winston Churchill standing with his hand resting on his walking stick and wearing a military greatcoat. His pose is based on a well-known photograph of Churchill inspecting the Chamber of the House of Commons after it had been destroyed by bombing on the night of 10–11 May 1941. The plinth is 8 feet (2.4 m) high with "Churchill" inscribed on it in large capital letters. A proposal to insert pins standing out of the statue's head was turned down in the 1970s – the pins were intended to stop wild birds from sitting on its head.

The Churchill Statue Committee had concerns during the statue's development process that it looked "a little too much" like the Italian Fascist leader Benito Mussolini. Whilst the head was still only cast in plaster, a report on it stated that, "At the moment the head is undoubtedly like Churchill, but perhaps not quite right of him at the pinnacle of his career. The cheeks, the eyes, the forehead and the top of the head require improvement. I told Mr. Roberts-Jones that above the eyes I thought I was looking at Mussolini." Roberts-Jones agreed to modify the sculpture to reduce the dome of the head in order to lower the forehead. Joe Whitlock Blundell and Roger Hudson, in their study of London statuary, The Immortals, contrast unfavourably Roberts-Jones' treatment of the greatcoat with that achieved by Charles Sargeant Jagger in his representations of infantrymen on the Great Western Railway and Royal Artillery Memorials, and suggest that Churchill's hunched shoulders convey "too much of the tortoise".

== History ==
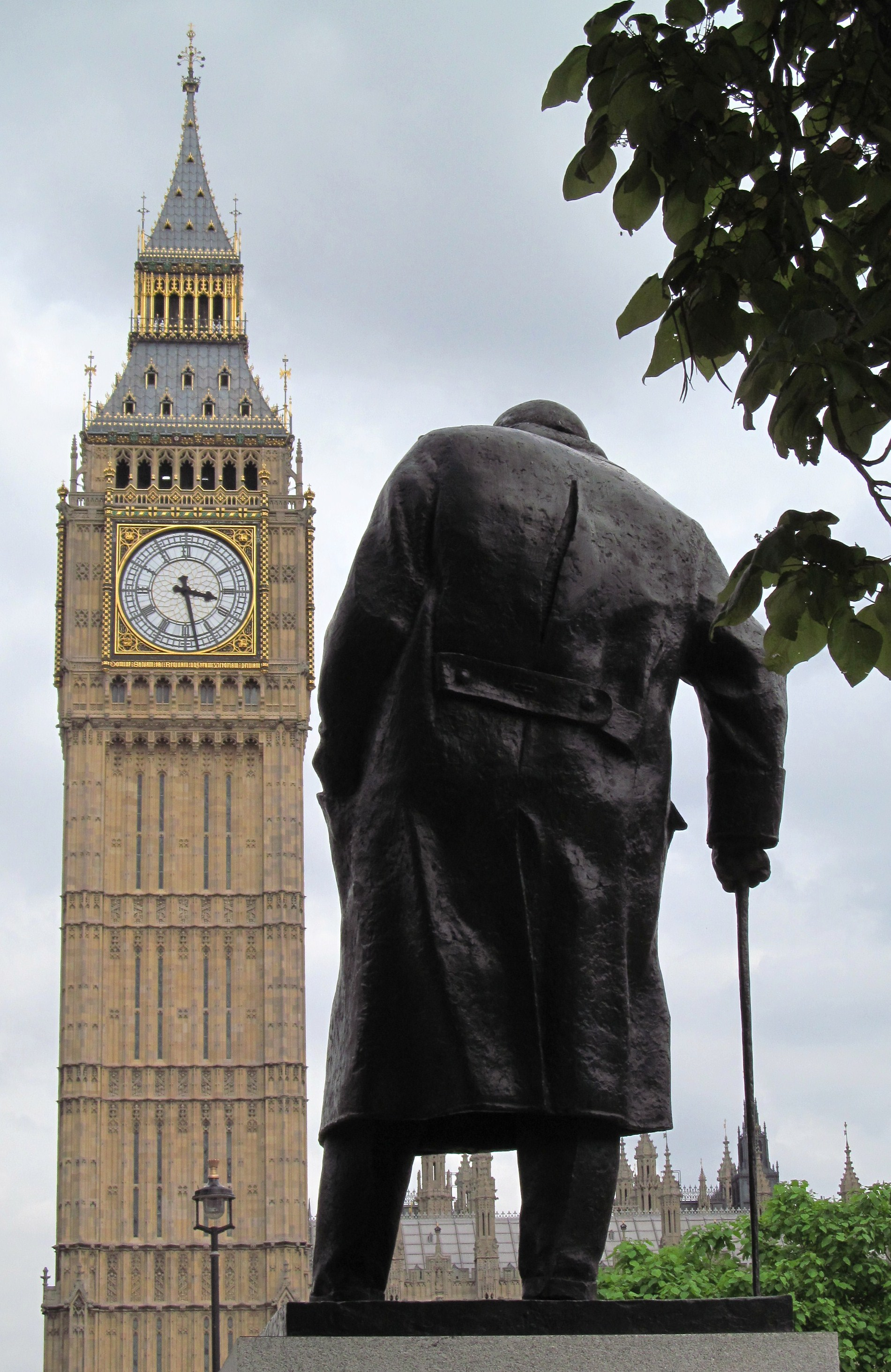
The statue overlooks the Houses of Parliament

In the 1950s, David Eccles, then Minister of Works, showed Churchill plans for the redevelopment of Parliament Square. Churchill drew a circle in the north-east corner and declared: "That is where my statue will go." The statue that was eventually installed was first suggested by John Tilney, Member of Parliament for Liverpool Wavertree, in a parliamentary question in 1968. Initial estimates by the sponsors of the Winston Churchill Statue Appeal put the cost of the statue at £30,000. The sponsors of the appeal included Edward Heath, Lord Mountbatten, Lord Portal, and Baroness Elliot. The sum of £32,000 was raised by 4,500 individuals who are listed in a book which was deposited in the library at Chartwell on Churchill's birthday, 30 November 1973. The statue was cast by the Meridian Foundry of Peckham Rye, London.

The statue was unveiled on 1 November 1973 by Clementine, Baroness Spencer-Churchill, Winston Churchill's widow. Queen Elizabeth II had declined to unveil the statue herself, indicating that she thought it right that Lady Spencer-Churchill should do so, although the Queen did attend the ceremony, and gave a speech in which she mentioned that Churchill had turned down a dukedom because he wanted to spend his remaining years in the House of Commons. Union Flags covered the statue, which were removed as a cord was pulled. Others present at the unveiling included The Queen Mother, members of the Churchill family across four generations, Edward Heath (then prime minister) and four former prime ministers. The Band of the Royal Marines played several of Churchill's favourite pieces of music.

In 2008, the statue was grade II listed.

An animation of the statue is included in the film short Happy and Glorious, made for and shown at the opening ceremony of the 2012 Summer Olympics.

The statue has been defaced on a number of occasions during protests held in Parliament Square. In 2000, at the May Day protest the statue was sprayed with red paint to give the appearance of blood dripping from its mouth and a strip of turf was placed on top of the head, giving the appearance of a mohican or punk rocker hairstyle. In June 2020, during the George Floyd protests, protesters sprayed graffiti on it over two successive days, including, following the inscription "Churchill", the words "was a racist". As a result, the statue was temporarily covered up to preserve it from further vandalism. A number of statues around the country, including that of Churchill, became part of a debate about whether they should remain on public display or not, and, if so, under what conditions. In October 2020, Benjamin Clark was fined £200 and ordered to pay £1,200 compensation for the vandalism. In February 2026, the statue was defaced with pro-Palestinian graffiti, including the phrase “Globalise the Intifada”, and a 38-year-old man was arrested on suspicion of racially aggravated criminal damage.

== Replicas and related statues ==
A replica of the Parliament Square statue was unveiled in 1999 in Winston Churchill Square in Prague, Czech Republic, outside the University of Economics in the Žižkov area. It was moulded from the original on site, then cast in bronze. A fibreglass replica stands on the Australian National University campus in Canberra, Australia: it was brought to Australia in 1975, placed in the courtyard garden of Churchill House in 1985, and moved to its present location in Acton sometime after 1992.

There are also variant statues of Churchill by Ivor Roberts-Jones on Solli plass in the "English Quarter" of Oslo, Norway; and in British Place, New Orleans, USA. Like the Parliament Square statue, the Prague, Oslo and New Orleans statues were all cast in London by the Meridian Foundry.

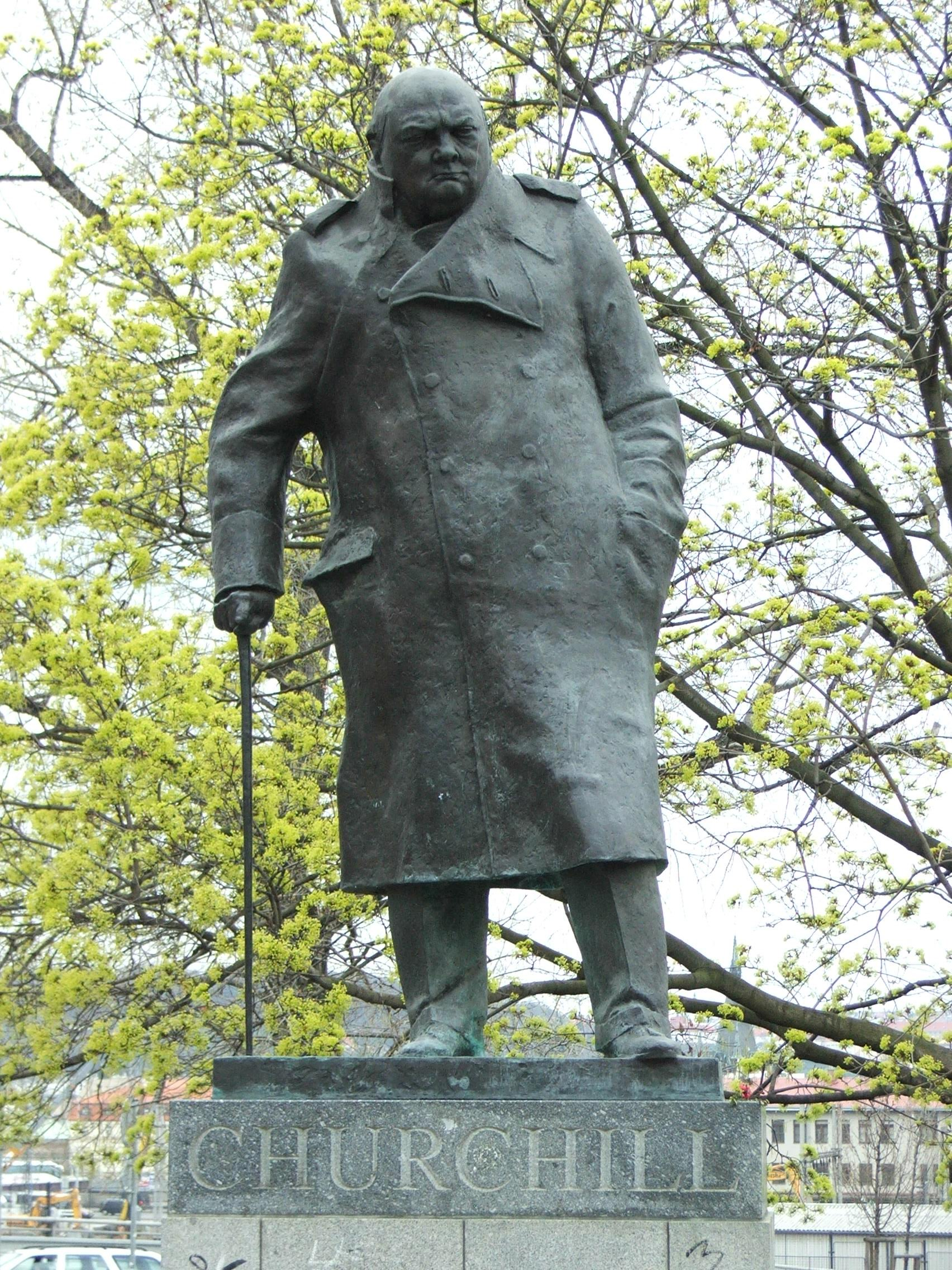
The cast in Prague

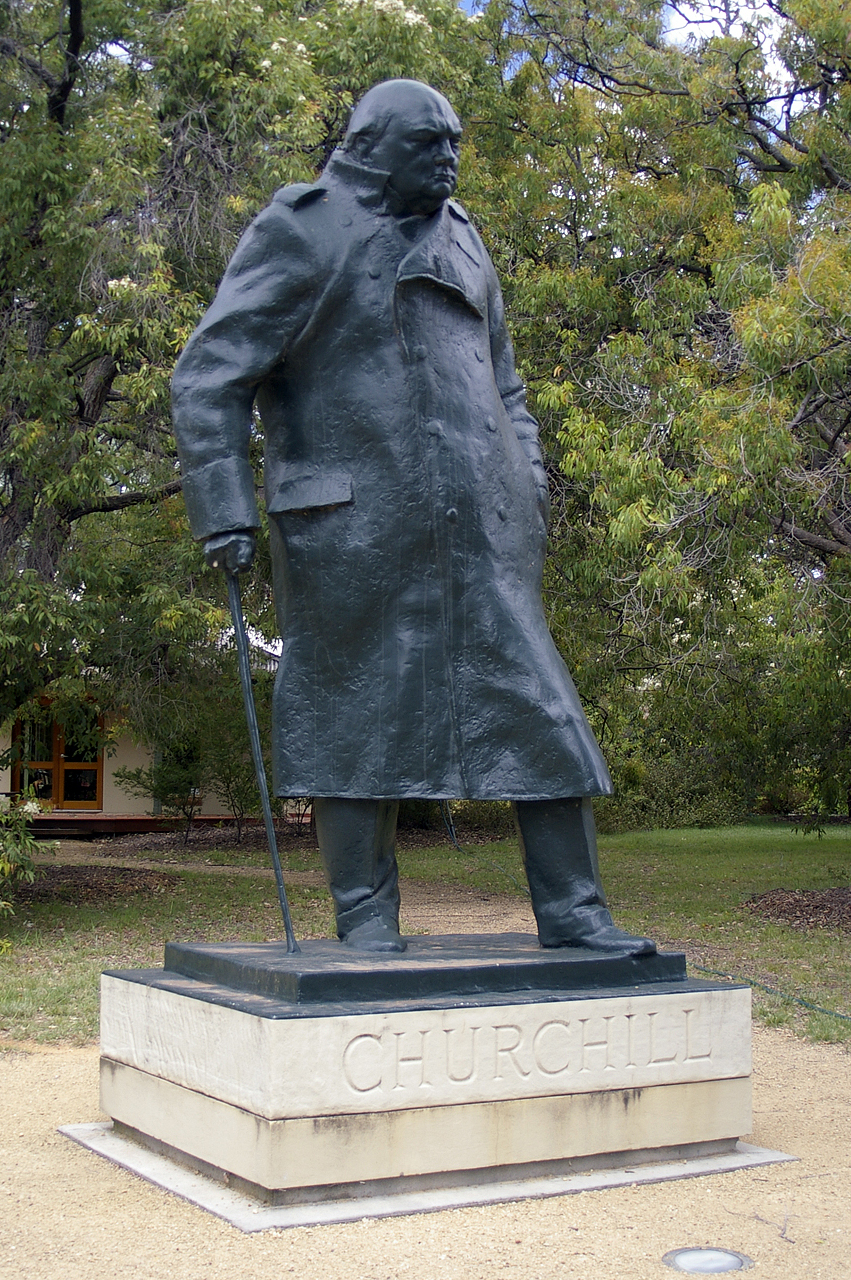
The cast in Canberra

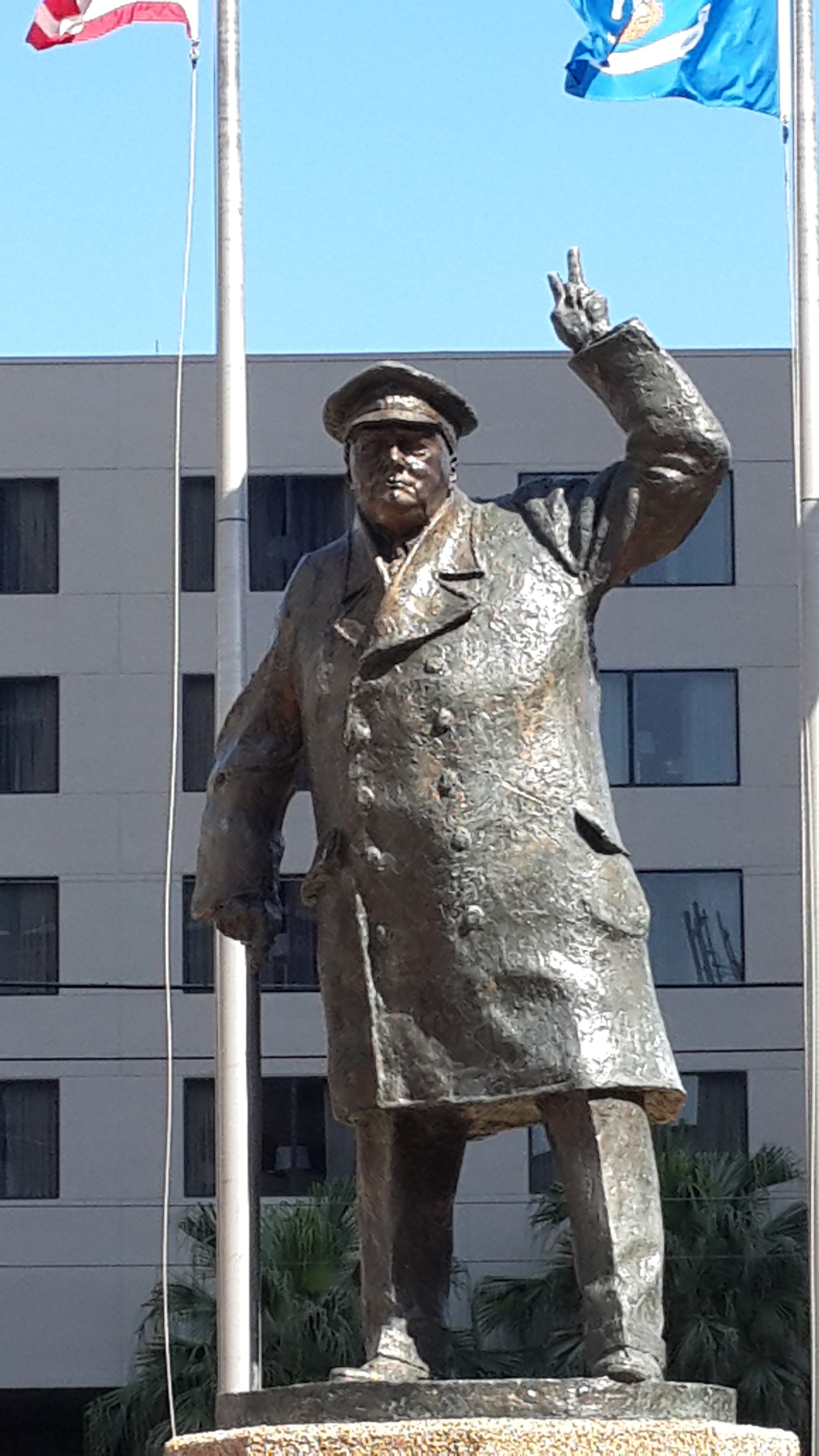
The statue in New Orleans

== See also ==
- List of public art in Westminster
- Statue of Winston Churchill, Palace of Westminster
