= Statue of Margaret Thatcher (Palace of Westminster) =

2007 bronze sculpture

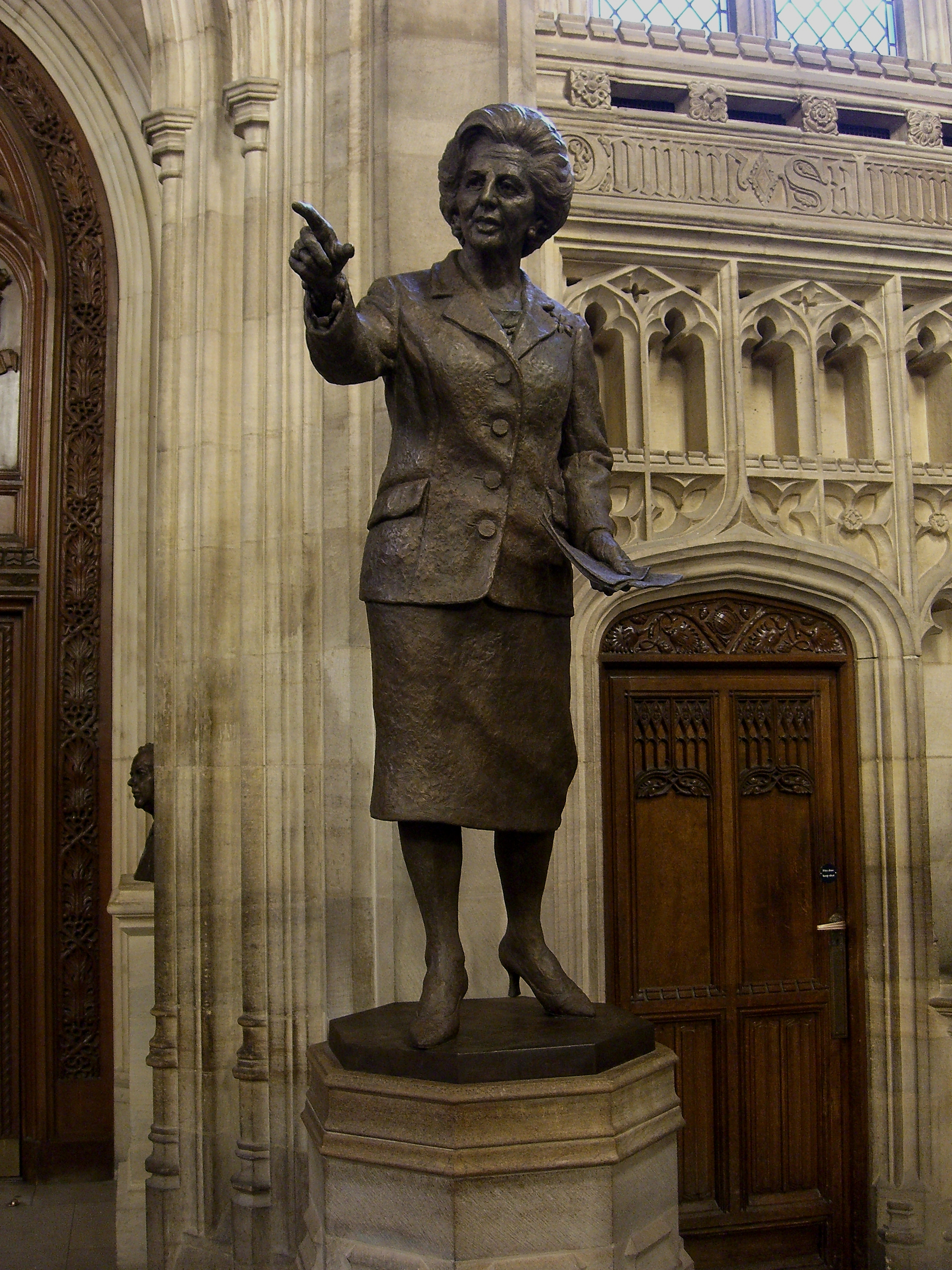
- Artist: Antony Dufort
- Completion date: 21 February 2007
- Medium: Bronze
- Subject: Margaret Thatcher
- Dimensions: 223 cm (88 in)
- Weight: 451 kilograms (994 lb)
- Location: Members' Lobby, Palace of Westminster, London; 51.4997°N 0.1248°W

A bronze statue of Margaret Thatcher, the first female prime minister of the United Kingdom, stands in the Members' Lobby of the Houses of Parliament in London. It was commissioned in 2003 following a change in rules to allow the depiction of living prime ministers in Parliament under certain conditions. The bronze statue, sculpted by Antony Dufort, was unveiled on 21 February 2007 by Michael Martin, Speaker of the House of Commons, with Thatcher in attendance.

== Description ==
The statue is 2.23 metres (7.3 ft) high, and cast in bronze. The design of the statue is intended to show Margaret Thatcher during her final term as prime minister, between 1987 and 1990. It stands directly opposite the statue of Sir Winston Churchill and the doors to the chamber of the House of Commons. Thatcher is depicted pointing with her right arm outstretched and holding a sheaf of papers in her left hand, posed as if addressing the House. It cost around £80,000, and weighs 451 kilograms (994 lb). Dufort also produced a single bust version of the statue, which was sold at a Conservative Party dinner in 2014 to an unknown buyer.

== History ==
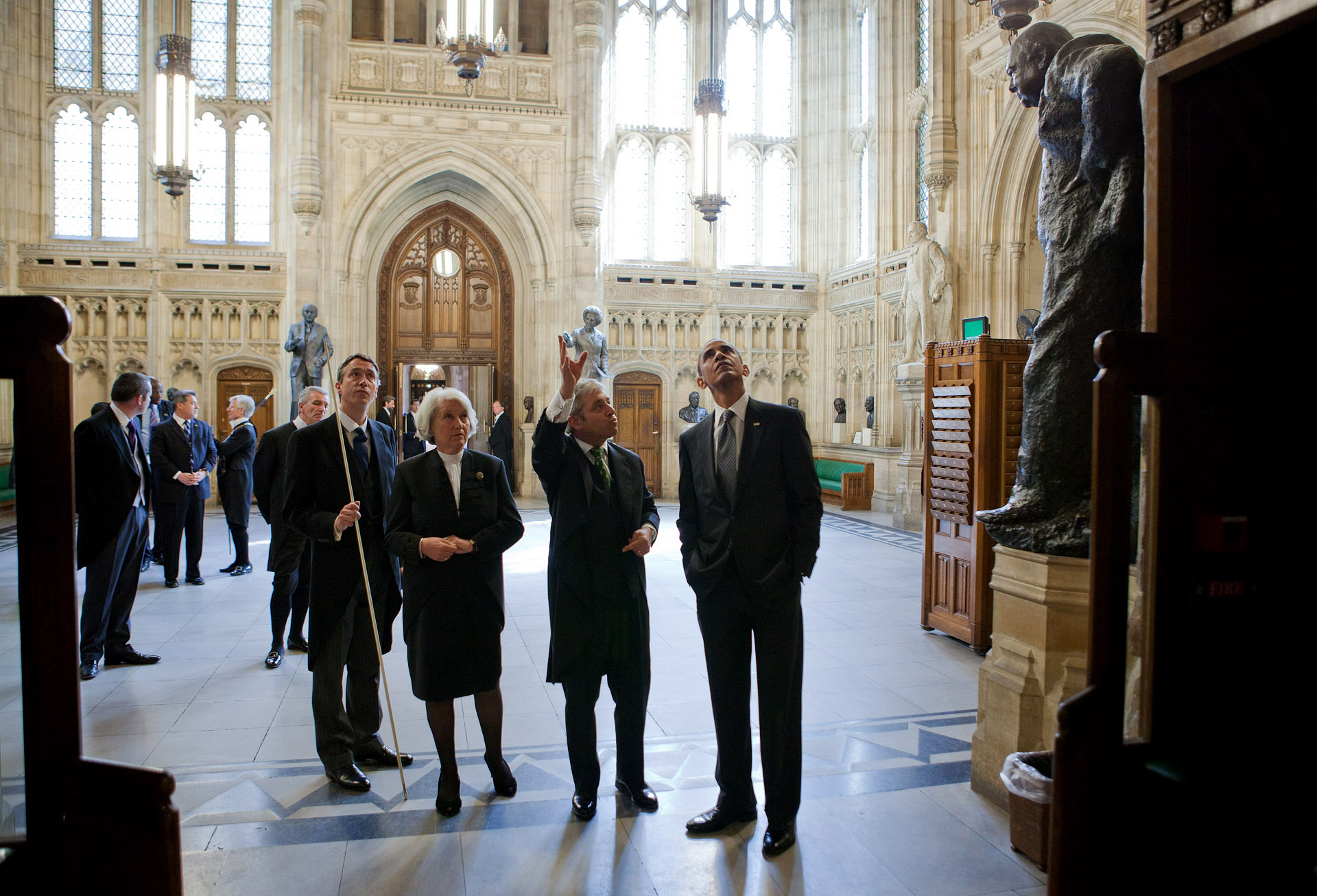
US President Barack Obama being given a tour of Parliament by the Speaker John Bercow, with the statue of Thatcher in the background (centre)

Historical rules prevented the erection of a statue in the Houses of Parliament of any living parliamentarian.

However, in 2002, these rules were changed to allow for a statue or bust to be displayed of a former prime minister once five years have passed after their death, or when three Parliaments have elapsed after their resignation from the post. The second criterion is on the proviso that at least twelve years have passed and that they are no longer a sitting MP. Following these rule changes, busts of former prime ministers Lord Callaghan and Sir Edward Heath were installed in the Members' Lobby in 2002. A statue of Margaret Thatcher was commissioned in 2003 from Antony Dufort by the Advisory Committee on the Works of Art with the intention of installing it in the Members' Lobby, adding to the numerous busts and three full-size bronze statues.

The statue was unveiled in the Members' Lobby on 21 February 2007 by the Speaker of the House of Commons, Rt Hon. Michael Martin MP. During a speech at the unveiling, Baroness Thatcher, nicknamed "The Iron Lady" during her tenure as prime minister, said, "I might have preferred iron, but bronze will do. It won't rust. And, this time I hope, the head will stay on." The beheading comment was in reference to a previous statue of Thatcher, originally intended for the Palace of Westminster, which was vandalised through decapitation whilst on loan to London's Guildhall Art Gallery.

After its erection, the statue was compared unfavourably with other statues due to its height as it is only around 2 feet (0.61 m) taller than Baroness Thatcher in real life. Comparisons were made with such statues as the statue of Winston Churchill outside the Houses of Parliament in Parliament Square which measures 3.66 metres (12.0 ft) high. The only statue suggested which was shorter than that of Margaret Thatcher in the Houses of Parliament, was that of Captain Cook near the Greenwich Observatory, which is only 1.98 metres (6.5 ft) high. Once installed, the statue of Thatcher left only three former prime ministers missing from being represented in the Members Lobby: Sir Henry Campbell-Bannerman, Bonar Law and Neville Chamberlain.

The statue's arrival was not welcomed by all MPs; the Labour MP Stephen Hepburn called for the removal of the statue only a week after it was installed. He gained the support of three other MPs, including Glenda Jackson.

In 2013, MPs were warned not to touch the statue's toes for good luck as it was damaging it.

== See also ==
- Statue of Margaret Thatcher (Grantham)
- Statue of Margaret Thatcher (London Guildhall)
