= Members' Lobby =

Hallway in the Palace of Westminster, London, England

Coordinates: 51°29′58.7″N 0°07′29.0″W

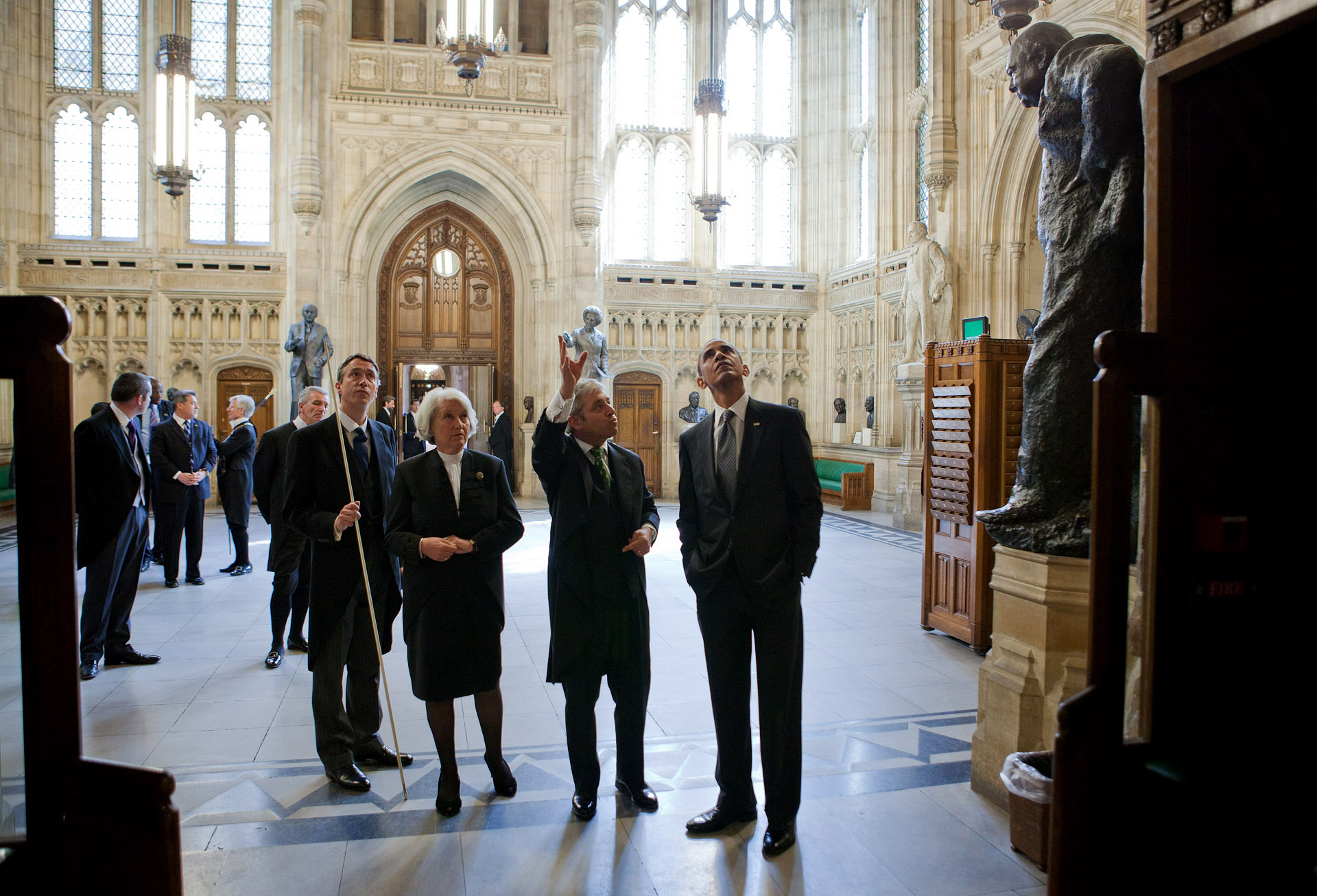
Speaker of the House of Commons John Bercow shows United States President Barack Obama around the Members' Lobby during a tour of Parliament in 2011

The Members' Lobby is a hallway in the Palace of Westminster used by members of the House of Commons, the lower house of the Parliament of the United Kingdom. Members of Parliament may congregate here for discussions while not dealing with other business.

The Lobby is situated immediately south of the Commons Chamber, close to the Central Lobby, and is off-limits to members of the public during voting sessions. It hosts offices of government and opposition whips, who are responsible for organising voting along party lines.

Former British prime ministers are honoured with statues and busts in the Lobby. The monuments include:

- Four bronze statues, located next to the main doors at either end of the Lobby, portraying David Lloyd George, Winston Churchill, Clement Attlee and Margaret Thatcher.
- Three stone statues, located next to the side doors, portraying Benjamin Disraeli, Arthur Balfour and H. H. Asquith. The fourth plinth in the set stands empty.
- Twelve bronze busts around the walls at the southern end, of Henry Campbell-Bannerman, Bonar Law, Ramsay MacDonald, Stanley Baldwin, Neville Chamberlain, Anthony Eden, Harold Macmillan, Alec Douglas-Home, Harold Wilson, Edward Heath, James Callaghan and John Major.

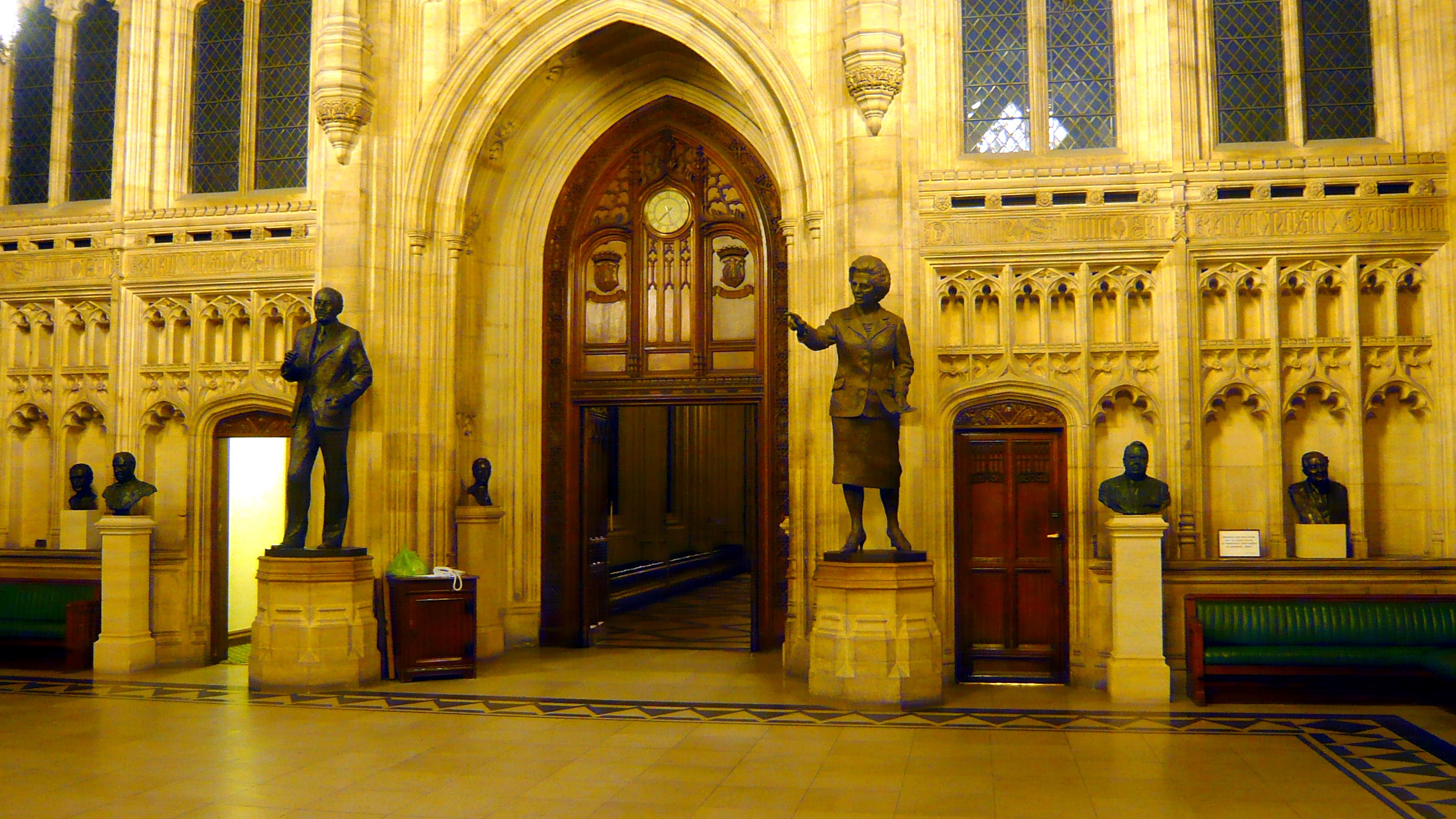
The doorway leading to Central Lobby, with a statue of Clement Attlee on its left side and Margaret Thatcher on its right.

The bronze statue of Thatcher was unveiled in February 2007, and placed close to the bust of her Conservative predecessor Edward Heath. The sculptures of Heath, Thatcher and James Callaghan were added sooner after their premierships than those of previous prime ministers, following a change in the rules on depiction in Parliament so as to allow representation within a person's lifetime, instead of at least 10 years after their death as was previously the case. Following the inclusion of Thatcher, the Commons Works of Art Committee subsequently pursued a special project to commemorate all Prime Ministers to hold office since 1902, searching for monuments to the three who still had yet to be recognised: Cambell-Bannerman, Law and Chamberlain. This project was successfully completed after the addition of a bust of her successor, John Major. A bust of Tony Blair has been approved by the Commons’ Works of Art Committee but no sculptor has yet been chosen. The Committee has also discussed plans for portraits of Gordon Brown, David Cameron and Nick Clegg.

The Members' Lobby was restored after its destruction during The Blitz in World War II, as attested by the monogram of King George VI on its doors. The bomb-damaged arch at the entrance to the Commons was retained as a reminder of 10–11 May 1941; it is now known as the "Churchill Arch". The feet of Oscar Nemon's bronze statue of Winston Churchill, as well as that of David Lloyd George, which flank the Commons doors, have been eroded, apparently by generations of MPs rubbing them for luck.
