= List of acts of the 3rd session of the 54th Parliament of the United Kingdom =

This is a list of acts of the 3rd session of the 54th Parliament of the United Kingdom, which ran from 6 November 2007 until 26 November 2008.

Acts passed since 1963 are cited by calendar year, as opposed to the convention used for earlier acts of citing the regnal year(s) in which the relevant parliamentary session was held. Each act passed in a respective year is given a chapter number (abbreviated "c."), denoted by Arabic numerals in the case of public general acts, lowercase Roman numerals in the case of local acts, or italicised Arabic numerals in the case of personal acts. These run as separate series.

36 acts of Parliament were passed by the 54th Parliament in its 3rd session: 33 public general acts and 3 local acts.

indicates that an act is available to view at legislation.gov.uk, and indicates the location of the original act in the Parliamentary Archives.

== Public general acts ==
{{legislationuk|act |- | {{|Consolidated Fund Act 2007|public|31|13-12-2007|maintained=y|repealed=y|An Act to authorise the use of resources for the service of the years ending with 31st March 2008 and 31st March 2009 and to apply certain sums out of the Consolidated Fund to the service of the years ending with 31st March 2008 and 31st March 2009.}} |- | {{|European Communities (Finance) Act 2008|public|1|19-02-2008|maintained=y|repealed=y|An Act to amend the definition of "the Treaties" and "the Community Treaties" in section 1(2) of the European Communities Act 1972 so as to include the decision of 7th June 2007 of the Council on the Communities' system of own resources.}} |- | {{|Banking (Special Provisions) Act 2008|public|2|21-02-2008|maintained=y|An Act to make provision to enable the Treasury in certain circumstances to make an order relating to the transfer of securities issued by, or of property, rights or liabilities belonging to, an authorised deposit-taker; to make further provision in relation to building societies; and for connected purposes.}} |- | {{|Appropriation Act 2008|public|3|20-03-2008|maintained=y|repealed=y|An Act to authorise the use of resources for the service of the years ending with 31st March 2007 and 31st March 2008 and to apply certain sums out of the Consolidated Fund to the service of the year ending with 31st March 2008; and to appropriate the supply authorised in this Session of Parliament for the service of the years ending with 31st March 2007 and 31st March 2008.}} |- | {{|Criminal Justice and Immigration Act 2008|public|4|08-05-2008|maintained=y|An Act to make further provision about criminal justice (including provision about the police) and dealing with offenders and defaulters; to make further provision about the management of offenders; to amend the criminal law; to make further provision for combatting crime and disorder; to make provision about the mutual recognition of financial penalties; to amend the Repatriation of Prisoners Act 1984; to make provision for a new immigration status in certain cases involving criminality; to make provision about the automatic deportation of criminals under the UK Borders Act 2007; to amend section 127 of the Criminal Justice and Public Order Act 1994 and to confer power to suspend the operation of that section; and for connected purposes.}} |- | {{|Channel Tunnel Rail Link (Supplementary Provisions) Act 2008|public|5|22-05-2008|maintained=y|An Act to make provision amending, and supplementary to, the Channel Tunnel Rail Link Act 1996.}} |- | {{|Child Maintenance and Other Payments Act 2008|public|6|05-06-2008|maintained=y|An Act to establish the Child Maintenance and Enforcement Commission; to amend the law relating to child support; to make provision about lump sum payments to or in respect of persons with diffuse mesothelioma; and for connected purposes.}} |- | {{|European Union (Amendment) Act 2008|public|7|19-06-2008|maintained=y|An Act to make provision in connection with the Treaty of Lisbon Amending the Treaty on European Union and the Treaty Establishing the European Community, signed at Lisbon on 13th December 2007.}} |- | {{|Appropriation (No. 2) Act 2008|public|8|21-07-2008|maintained=y|repealed=y|An Act to authorise the use of resources for the service of the year ending with 31st March 2009 and to apply certain sums out of the Consolidated Fund to the service of the year ending with 31st March 2009; to appropriate the supply authorised in this Session of Parliament for the service of the year ending with 31st March 2009; and to repeal certain Consolidated Fund and Appropriation Acts.}} |- | {{|Finance Act 2008|public|9|21-07-2008|maintained=y|An Act to grant certain duties, to alter other duties, and to amend the law relating to the National Debt and the Public Revenue, and to make further provision in connection with finance.}} |- | {{|Sale of Student Loans Act 2008|public|10|21-07-2008|maintained=y|An Act to enable the sale of rights to repayments of student loans; and for connected purposes.}} |- | {{|Special Educational Needs (Information) Act 2008|public|11|21-07-2008|maintained=y|An Act to amend the Education Act 1996 in relation to the provision and publication of information about children who have special educational needs; and for connected purposes.}} |- | {{|Statute Law (Repeals) Act 2008|public|12|21-07-2008|maintained=y|An Act to promote the reform of the statute law by the repeal, in accordance with recommendations of the Law Commission and the Scottish Law Commission, of certain enactments which (except in so far as their effect is preserved) are no longer of practical utility, and to make other provision in connection with the repeal of those enactments.}} |- | {{|Regulatory Enforcement and Sanctions Act 2008|public|13|21-07-2008|maintained=y|An Act to make provision for the establishment of the Local Better Regulation Office; for the co-ordination of regulatory enforcement by local authorities; for the creation of civil sanctions in relation to regulatory offences; for the reduction and removal of regulatory burdens; and for connected purposes.}} |- | {{|Health and Social Care Act 2008|public|14|21-07-2008|maintained=y|An Act to establish and make provision in connection with a Care Quality Commission; to make provision about health care (including provision about the National Health Service) and about social care; to make provision about reviews and investigations under the Mental Health Act 1983; to establish and make provision in connection with an Office of the Health Professions Adjudicator and make other provision about the regulation of the health care professions; to confer power to modify the regulation of social care workers; to amend the Public Health (Control of Disease) Act 1984; to provide for the payment of a grant to women in connection with pregnancy; to amend the functions of the Health Protection Agency; and for connected purposes.}} |- | {{|Criminal Evidence (Witness Anonymity) Act 2008|public|15|21-07-2008|maintained=y|An Act to make provision for the making of orders for securing the anonymity of witnesses in criminal proceedings.}} |- | {{|National Insurance Contributions Act 2008|public|16|21-07-2008|maintained=y|An Act to make provision in connection with the upper earnings limit for national insurance contributions (including in particular provision about the upper accrual point).}} |- | {{|Housing and Regeneration Act 2008|public|17|22-07-2008|maintained=y|An Act to establish the Homes and Communities Agency and make provision about it; to abolish the Urban Regeneration Agency and the Commission for the New Towns and make provision in connection with their abolition; to regulate social housing; to enable the abolition of the Housing Corporation; to make provision about sustainability certificates, landlord and tenant matters, building regulations and mobile homes; to make further provision about housing; and for connected purposes.}} |- | {{|Crossrail Act 2008|public|18|22-07-2008|maintained=y|An Act to make provision for a railway transport system running from Maidenhead, in the County of Berkshire, and Heathrow Airport, in the London Borough of Hillingdon, through central London to Shenfield, in the County of Essex, and Abbey Wood, in the London Borough of Greenwich; and for connected purposes.}} |- | {{|Appropriation (No. 3) Act 2008|public|19|16-10-2008|maintained=y|repealed=y|An Act to authorise the use of resources for the service of the year ending with 31st March 2009 and to apply a sum out of the Consolidated Fund to the service of that year; and to appropriate the supply authorised by this Act for the service of that year.}} |- | {{|Health and Safety (Offences) Act 2008|public|20|16-10-2008|maintained=y|An Act to revise the mode of trial and maximum penalties applicable to certain offences relating to health and safety.}} |- | {{|Planning and Energy Act 2008|public|21|13-11-2008|maintained=y|An Act to enable local planning authorities to set requirements for energy use and energy efficiency in local plans.}} |- | {{|Human Fertilisation and Embryology Act 2008|public|22|13-11-2008|maintained=y|An Act to amend the Human Fertilisation and Embryology Act 1990 and the Surrogacy Arrangements Act 1985; to make provision about the persons who in certain circumstances are to be treated in law as the parents of a child; and for connected purposes.}} |- | {{|Children and Young Persons Act 2008|public|23|13-11-2008|maintained=y|An Act to make provision about the delivery of local authority social work services for children and young persons; to amend Parts 2 and 3 of the Children Act 1989; to make further provision about the functions of local authorities and others in relation to children and young persons; to make provision about the enforcement of care standards in relation to certain establishments or agencies connected with children; to make provision about the independent review of determinations relating to adoption; and for connected purposes.}} |- | {{|Employment Act 2008|public|24|13-11-2008|maintained=y|An Act to make provision about the procedure for the resolution of employment disputes; to provide for compensation for financial loss in cases of unlawful underpayment or non-payment; to make provision about the enforcement of minimum wages legislation and the application of the national minimum wage to Cadet Force Adult Volunteers and voluntary workers; to make provision about the enforcement of offences under the Employment Agencies Act 1973; to make provision about the right of trade unions to expel or exclude members on the grounds of membership of a political party; and for connected purposes.}} |- | {{|Education and Skills Act 2008|public|25|26-11-2008|maintained=y|An Act to make provision about education and training; and for connected purposes.}} |- | {{|Local Transport Act 2008|public|26|26-11-2008|maintained=y|An Act to make further provision in relation to local transport authorities, the provision and regulation of road transport services and the subsidising of passenger transport services; to amend sections 74, 75 and 79 of the Transport Act 1985; to make provision for or in relation to committees which represent the interests of users of public transport; to rename Passenger Transport Authorities as Integrated Transport Authorities and to make further provision in relation to them; to make further provision in relation to charging for the use of roads; to make provision about the meaning of "street works" and "street works licence" in Part 3 of the New Roads and Street Works Act 1991; to amend Part 6 of the Traffic Management Act 2004 and section 90F of the Road Traffic Offenders Act 1988; to make provision in relation to the acquisition, disclosure and use of information relating to vehicles registered outside the United Kingdom; and for connected purposes.}} |- | {{|Climate Change Act 2008|public|27|26-11-2008|maintained=y|An Act to set a target for the year 2050 for the reduction of targeted greenhouse gas emissions; to provide for a system of carbon budgeting; to establish a Committee on Climate Change; to confer powers to establish trading schemes for the purpose of limiting greenhouse gas emissions or encouraging activities that reduce such emissions or remove greenhouse gas from the atmosphere; to make provision about adaptation to climate change; to confer powers to make schemes for providing financial incentives to produce less domestic waste and to recycle more of what is produced; to make provision about the collection of household waste; to confer powers to make provision about charging for single use carrier bags; to amend the provisions of the Energy Act 2004 about renewable transport fuel obligations; to make provision about carbon emissions reduction targets; to make other provision about climate change; and for connected purposes.}} |- | {{|Counter-Terrorism Act 2008|public|28|26-11-2008|maintained=y|An Act to confer further powers to gather and share information for counter-terrorism and other purposes; to make further provision about the detention and questioning of terrorist suspects and the prosecution and punishment of terrorist offences; to impose notification requirements on persons convicted of such offences; to confer further powers to act against terrorist financing, money laundering and certain other activities; to provide for review of certain Treasury decisions and about evidence in, and other matters connected with, review proceedings; to amend the law relating to inquiries; to amend the definition of "terrorism"; to amend the enactments relating to terrorist offences, control orders and the forfeiture of terrorist cash; to provide for recovering the costs of policing at certain gas facilities; to amend provisions about the appointment of special advocates in Northern Ireland; and for connected purposes.}} |- | {{|Planning Act 2008|public|29|26-11-2008|maintained=y|An Act to establish the Infrastructure Planning Commission and make provision about its functions; to make provision about, and about matters ancillary to, the authorisation of projects for the development of nationally significant infrastructure; to make provision about town and country planning; to make provision about the imposition of a Community Infrastructure Levy; and for connected purposes.}} |- | {{|Pensions Act 2008|public|30|26-11-2008|maintained=y|An Act to make provision relating to pensions; and for connected purposes.}} |- | {{|Dormant Bank and Building Society Accounts Act 2008|public|31|26-11-2008|maintained=y|An Act to make provision for, and in connection with, using money from dormant bank and building society accounts for social or environmental purposes.}} |- | {{|Energy Act 2008|public|32|26-11-2008|maintained=y|An Act to make provision relating to gas importation and storage; to make provision in relation to electricity generated from renewable sources; to make provision relating to electricity transmission; to make provision about payments to small-scale generators of low-carbon electricity; to make provision about the decommissioning of energy installations and wells; to make provision about the management and disposal of waste produced during the operation of nuclear installations; to make provision relating to petroleum licences; to make provision about third party access to oil and gas infrastructure and modifications of pipelines; to make provision about reports relating to energy matters; to make provision about the duties of the Gas and Electricity Markets Authority; to make provision about payments in respect of the renewable generation of heat; to make provision relating to gas meters and electricity meters and provision relating to electricity safety; to make provision about the security of equipment, software and information relating to nuclear matters; and for connected purposes.}} }}

== Local acts ==
{{legislationuk|act |- | {{|Transport for London Act 2008|local|1|22-05-2008|maintained=y|An Act to confer further powers upon Transport for London; and for related purposes.}} |- | {{|St. Austell Market Act 2008|local|2|19-06-2008|maintained=y|An Act to provide for the vesting of the undertaking of The Commissioners of St. Austell Markets and Fairs in St. Austell Market House CIC and for the continuance of that undertaking; to repeal the St. Austell Market Act 1842; and for connected purposes.}} |- | {{|London Local Authorities and Transport for London Act 2008|local|3|21-07-2008|maintained=y|An Act to confer further powers upon local authorities in London and upon Transport for London; and for related purposes.}} }}
