= List of acts of the 4th session of the 53rd Parliament of the United Kingdom =

This is a list of acts of the 4th session of the 53rd Parliament of the United Kingdom, which ran from 23 November 2004 until 7 April 2005.

Acts passed since 1963 are cited by calendar year, as opposed to the convention used for earlier acts of citing the regnal year(s) in which the relevant parliamentary session was held. Each act passed in a respective year is given a chapter number (abbreviated "c."), denoted by Arabic numerals in the case of public general acts, lowercase Roman numerals in the case of local acts, or italicised Arabic numerals in the case of personal acts. These run as separate series.

21 acts of Parliament were passed by the 53rd Parliament in its 4th session; all were public general acts.

indicates that an act is available to view at legislation.gov.uk, and indicates the location of the original act in the Parliamentary Archives.

== Public general acts ==
{{legislationuk|act |- | {{|Consolidated Fund (No. 2) Act 2004|public|38|16-12-2004|maintained=y|repealed=y|An Act to authorise the use of resources for the service of the years ending with 31st March 2005 and 31st March 2006 and to apply certain sums out of the Consolidated Fund to the service of the years ending with 31st March 2005 and 31st March 2006.}} |- | {{|Electoral Registration (Northern Ireland) Act 2005|public|1|24-02-2005|maintained=y|An Act to make provision about the registration of electors in Northern Ireland in cases where required information is not provided.}} |- | {{|Prevention of Terrorism Act 2005|public|2|11-03-2005|maintained=y|repealed=y|An Act to provide for the making against individuals involved in terrorism-related activity of orders imposing obligations on them for purposes connected with preventing or restricting their further involvement in such activity; to make provision about appeals and other proceedings relating to such orders; and for connected purposes.}} |- | {{|Appropriation Act 2005|public|3|17-03-2005|maintained=y|repealed=y|An Act to authorise the use of resources for the service of the years ending with 31st March 2004 and 31st March 2005 and to apply certain sums out of the Consolidated Fund to the service of the years ending with 31st March 2004 and 31st March 2005; and to appropriate the supply authorised in this Session of Parliament for the service of the years ending with 31st March 2004 and 31st March 2005.}} |- | {{|Constitutional Reform Act 2005|public|4|24-03-2005|maintained=y|An Act to make provision for modifying the office of Lord Chancellor, and to make provision relating to the functions of that office; to establish a Supreme Court of the United Kingdom, and to abolish the appellate jurisdiction of the House of Lords; to make provision about the jurisdiction of the Judicial Committee of the Privy Council and the judicial functions of the President of the Council; to make other provision about the judiciary, their appointment and discipline; and for connected purposes.}} |- | {{|Income Tax (Trading and Other Income) Act 2005|public|5|24-03-2005|maintained=y|An Act to restate, with minor changes, certain enactments relating to income tax on trading income, property income, savings and investment income and certain other income; and for connected purposes.}} |- | {{|Child Benefit Act 2005|public|6|24-03-2005|maintained=y|An Act to make provision for and in connection with altering the descriptions of persons in respect of whom a person may be entitled to child benefit.}} |- | {{|Finance Act 2005|public|7|07-04-2005|maintained=y|An Act to grant certain duties, to alter other duties, and to amend the law relating to the National Debt and the Public Revenue, and to make further provision in connection with finance.}} |- | {{|Appropriation (No. 2) Act 2005|public|8|07-04-2005|maintained=y|repealed=y|An Act to appropriate the supply authorised in this Session of Parliament for the service of the year ending with 31st March 2006.}} |- | {{|Mental Capacity Act 2005|public|9|07-04-2005|maintained=y|An Act to make new provision relating to persons who lack capacity; to establish a superior court of record called the Court of Protection in place of the office of the Supreme Court called by that name; to make provision in connection with the Convention on the International Protection of Adults signed at the Hague on 13th January 2000; and for connected purposes.}} |- | {{|Public Services Ombudsman (Wales) Act 2005|public|10|07-04-2005|maintained=y|An Act to establish and make provision about the office of Public Services Ombudsman for Wales; to make provision about the functions of the Public Services Ombudsman for Wales; to make provision about compensation; to abolish the Commission for Local Administration in Wales and the offices of Welsh Administration Ombudsman, Health Service Commissioner for Wales and Social Housing Ombudsman for Wales; and for connected purposes.}} |- | {{|Commissioners for Revenue and Customs Act 2005|public|11|07-04-2005|maintained=y|An Act to make provision for the appointment of Commissioners to exercise functions presently vested in the Commissioners of Inland Revenue and the Commissioners of Customs and Excise; for the establishment of a Revenue and Customs Prosecutions Office; and for connected purposes.}} |- | {{|Inquiries Act 2005|public|12|07-04-2005|maintained=y|An Act to make provision about the holding of inquiries.}} |- | {{|Disability Discrimination Act 2005|public|13|07-04-2005|maintained=y|An Act to amend the Disability Discrimination Act 1995; and for connected purposes.}} |- | {{|Railways Act 2005|public|14|07-04-2005|maintained=y|An Act to amend the law relating to the provision and regulation of railway services; and for connected purposes.}} |- | {{|Serious Organised Crime and Police Act 2005|public|15|07-04-2005|maintained=y|An Act to provide for the establishment and functions of the Serious Organised Crime Agency; to make provision about investigations, prosecutions, offenders and witnesses in criminal proceedings and the protection of persons involved in investigations or proceedings; to provide for the implementation of certain international obligations relating to criminal matters; to amend the Proceeds of Crime Act 2002; to make further provision for combatting crime and disorder, including new provision about powers of arrest and search warrants and about parental compensation orders; to make further provision about the police and policing and persons supporting the police; to make provision for protecting certain organisations from interference with their activities; to make provision about criminal records; to provide for the Private Security Industry Act 2001 to extend to Scotland; and for connected purposes.}} |- | {{|Clean Neighbourhoods and Environment Act 2005|public|16|07-04-2005|maintained=y|An Act to amend section 6 of the Crime and Disorder Act 1998; to make provision for the gating of certain minor highways; to make provision in relation to vehicles parked on roads that are exposed for sale or being repaired; to make provision in relation to abandoned vehicles and the removal and disposal of vehicles; to make provision relating to litter and refuse, graffiti, fly-posting and the display of advertisements; to make provision relating to the transportation, collection, disposal and management of waste; to make provision relating to the control of dogs and to amend the law relating to stray dogs; to make provision in relation to noise; to provide for the Commission for Architecture and the Built Environment and for the making of grants relating to the quality of the built environment; to amend the law relating to abandoned shopping and luggage trolleys; to amend the law relating to statutory nuisances; to amend section 78L of the Environmental Protection Act 1990; to amend the law relating to offences under Schedule 1 to the Pollution Prevention and Control Act 1999; and for connected purposes.}} |- | {{|Drugs Act 2005|public|17|07-04-2005|maintained=y|An Act to make provision in connection with controlled drugs and for the making of orders to supplement anti-social behaviour orders in cases where behaviour is affected by drug misuse or other prescribed factors.}} |- | {{|Education Act 2005|public|18|07-04-2005|maintained=y|An Act to make provision about the inspection of schools, child minding, day care, nursery education and careers services; to make other provision about school education; to make provision about the training of persons who work in schools and other persons who teach, about the supply of personal information for purposes related to education and about the attendance of children at educational provision outside schools; and for connected purposes.}} |- | {{|Gambling Act 2005|public|19|07-04-2005|maintained=y|An Act to make provision about gambling.}} |- | {{|International Organisations Act 2005|public|20|07-04-2005|maintained=y|An Act to make provision about privileges, immunities and facilities in connection with certain international organisations.}} }}
