= List of acts of the 4th session of the 45th Parliament of the United Kingdom =

This is a list of acts of the 4th session of the 45th Parliament of the United Kingdom, which ran from 30 October 1973 until 8 February 1974.

Acts passed since 1963 are cited by calendar year, as opposed to the convention used for earlier acts of citing the regnal year(s) in which the relevant parliamentary session was held. Each act passed in a respective year is given a chapter number (abbreviated "c."), denoted by Arabic numerals in the case of public general acts, lowercase Roman numerals in the case of local acts, or italicised Arabic numerals in the case of personal acts. These run as separate series.

19 acts of Parliament were passed by the 45th Parliament in its 4th session: 15 public general acts and 4 local acts.

indicates that an act is available to view at legislation.gov.uk, and indicates the location of the original act in the Parliamentary Archives.

== Public general acts ==
{{legislationuk|act |- | {{|Channel Tunnel (Initial Finance) Act 1973|public|66|13-11-1973|maintained=y|An Act to make financial provision in relation to preliminary work on or in connection with the construction of a railway tunnel system under the English Channel.}} |- | {{|Fuel and Electricity (Control) Act 1973|public|67|06-12-1973|maintained=y|An Act to make temporary provision for controlling the production, supply, acquisition and use of certain substances and of electricity; and for purposes connected with those matters.}} |- | {{|International Sugar Organisation Act 1973|public|68|19-12-1973|maintained=y|An Act to provide for the continued application to the International Sugar Organisation of section 1 of the International Organisations Act 1968.}} |- | {{|Northern Ireland Constitution (Amendment) Act 1973|public|69|19-12-1973|maintained=y|An Act to provide that the number of persons who may hold appointments under section 8 of the Northern Ireland Constitution Act 1973 shall be increased to fifteen of whom not more than eleven may be members of the Northern Ireland Executive appointed in accordance with this Act.}} |- | {{|Consolidated Fund Act 1974|public|1|22-01-1974|An Act to apply certain sums out of the Consolidated Fund to the service of the years ending on 31st March 1974 and 1975.}} |- | {{|Appropriation Act 1974|public|2|08-02-1974|An Act to appropriate the supplies granted in this Session of Parliament.}} |- | {{|Slaughterhouses Act 1974|public|3|08-02-1974|maintained=y|An Act to consolidate certain enactments relating to slaughterhouses and knackers' yards and the slaughter of animals.}} |- | {{|Legal Aid Act 1974|public|4|08-02-1974|An Act to consolidate certain enactments relating to legal aid and legal advice and assistance.}} |- | {{|Horticulture (Special Payments) Act 1974|public|5|08-02-1974|maintained=y|An Act to authorise payments out of moneys provided by Parliament to assist certain commercial growers of horticultural produce, the growing of which has become uneconomic as a result of the United Kingdom's membership of the European Economic Community.}} |- | {{|Biological Weapons Act 1974|public|6|08-02-1974|maintained=y|An Act to prohibit the development, production, acquisition and possession of certain biological agents and toxins and of biological weapons.}} |- | {{|Local Government Act 1974|link=Local Government Act 1974 (United Kingdom)|public|7|08-02-1974|maintained=y|An Act to make further provision, in relation to England and Wales, with respect to the payment of grants to local authorities, rating and valuation, borrowing and lending by local authorities and the classification of highways; to extend the powers of the Countryside Commission to give financial assistance; to provide for the establishment of Commissions for the investigation of administrative action taken by or on behalf of local and other authorities; to restrict certain grants under the Transport Act 1968; to provide for the removal or relaxation of certain statutory controls affecting local government activities; to make provision in relation to the collection of sums by local authorities on behalf of water authorities; to amend section 259(3) of the Local Government Act 1972 and to make certain minor amendments of or consequential on that Act; and for connected purposes.}} |- | {{|Statutory Corporations (Financial Provisions) Act 1974|public|8|08-02-1974|maintained=y|An Act to make provision for compensating certain statutory corporations in respect of financial loss due to compliance with the national policy relating to limitation of prices, and for extending the borrowing powers of certain statutory corporations; and for purposes connected with those matters.}} |- | {{|Pensions (Increase) Act 1974|public|9|08-02-1974|maintained=y|An Act to provide for increases of certain official pensions and to amend the Pensions (Increase) Act 1971; and for purposes connected therewith.}} |- | {{|Representation of the People Act 1974|public|10|08-02-1974|An Act to increase the limits on candidates' election expenses at elections to the Parliament of the United Kingdom, and for connected purposes.}} |- | {{|Charlwood and Horley Act 1974|public|11|08-02-1974|maintained=y|An Act to transfer parts of the new parishes of Charlwood and Horley to the new county of Surrey, and for connected purposes.}} }}

== Local acts ==
{{legislationuk|act |- | {{|Edinburgh Corporation (No. 2) Order Confirmation Act 1973|local|34|06-12-1973|An Act to confirm a Provisional Order under the Private Legislation Procedure (Scotland) Act 1936, relating to Edinburgh Corporation (No. 2).|po1=Edinburgh Corporation (No. 2) Order 1973|Provisional Order to confer powers on the Corporation of the city of Edinburgh with respect to the local government and administration of the city, including provisions as to stray dogs, the granting of certificates for the sale of excisable liquor at the King's Theatre, refuse collection and the control of the distribution of handbills in streets; to amend and repeal certain provisions of the Edinburgh Corporation Order 1967; and for other purposes.}} |- | {{|Clyde Port Authority (Hunterston Ore Terminal) Order Confirmation Act 1973|local|35|19-12-1973|An Act to confirm a Provisional Order under the Private Legislation Procedure (Scotland) Act 1936, relating to Clyde Port Authority (Hunterston Ore Terminal).|po1=Clyde Port Authority (Hunterston Ore Terminal) Order 1973|Provisional Order to authorise the Clyde Port Authority to construct works and acquire land; and for other purposes.}} |- | {{|North Wales Hydro Electric Power Act 1973|local|36|19-12-1973|An Act to confer powers upon the Central Electricity Generating Board for the construction and erection of works and a generating station in the county of Caernarvon and for the acquisition of lands and easements for the purposes thereof or in connection therewith; and for other purposes.}} |- | {{|Harwich Harbour Act 1974|local|1|08-02-1974|An Act to consolidate with amendments statutory provisions relating to the Harwich Harbour Conservancy Board; to confer new powers on the Board; and for other purposes.}} }}
