= List of acts of the 2nd session of the 52nd Parliament of the United Kingdom =

This is a list of acts of the 2nd session of the 52nd Parliament of the United Kingdom, which ran from 24 November 1998 until 11 November 1999.

Acts passed since 1963 are cited by calendar year, as opposed to the convention used for earlier acts of citing the regnal year(s) in which the relevant parliamentary session was held. Each act passed in a respective year is given a chapter number (abbreviated "c."), denoted by Arabic numerals in the case of public general acts, lowercase Roman numerals in the case of local acts, or italicised Arabic numerals in the case of personal acts. These run as separate series.

39 acts of Parliament were passed by the 52nd Parliament in its 2nd session: 35 public general acts and 4 local acts.

indicates that an act is available to view at legislation.gov.uk, and indicates the location of the original act in the Parliamentary Archives.

== Public general acts ==
{{legislationuk|act |- | {{|Consolidated Fund (No. 2) Act 1998|public|49|17-12-1998|maintained=y|An Act to apply certain sums out of the Consolidated Fund to the service of the years ending on 31st March 1999 and 2000.}} |- | {{|European Parliamentary Elections Act 1999|public|1|14-01-1999|maintained=y|An Act to amend the European Parliamentary Elections Act 1978 so as to alter the method used in Great Britain for electing Members of the European Parliament; to make other amendments of enactments relating to the election of Members of the European Parliament; and for connected purposes.}} |- | {{|Social Security Contributions (Transfer of Functions, etc.) Act 1999|public|2|25-02-1999|maintained=y|An Act to transfer from the Secretary of State to the Commissioners of Inland Revenue or the Treasury certain functions relating to national insurance contributions, the National Insurance Fund, statutory sick pay, statutory maternity pay or pension schemes and certain associated functions relating to benefits; to enable functions relating to any of those matters in respect of Northern Ireland to be transferred to the Secretary of State, the Commissioners of Inland Revenue or the Treasury; to make further provision, in connection with the functions transferred, as to the powers of the Commissioners of Inland Revenue, the making of decisions and appeals; to provide that rebates payable in respect of members of money purchase contracted-out pension schemes are to be payable out of the National Insurance Fund; and for connected purposes.}} |- | {{|Road Traffic (NHS Charges) Act 1999|public|3|10-03-1999|maintained=y|An Act to make provision about the recovery from insurers and certain other persons of charges in connection with the treatment of road traffic casualties in national health service, and certain other, hospitals; and for connected purposes.}} |- | {{|Consolidated Fund Act 1999|public|4|25-03-1999|maintained=y|An Act to apply certain sums out of the Consolidated Fund to the service of the years ending on 31st March 1998 and 1999.}} |- | {{|Scottish Enterprise Act 1999|public|5|26-05-1999|maintained=y|An Act to make provision with respect to the financial limits in section 25(2) of the Enterprise and New Towns (Scotland) Act 1990.}} |- | {{|Rating (Valuation) Act 1999|public|6|26-05-1999|maintained=y|An Act to make provision about valuation for purposes of non-domestic rates in England and Wales.}} |- | {{|Northern Ireland (Location of Victims' Remains) Act 1999|public|7|26-05-1999|maintained=y|An Act to make provision connected with Northern Ireland about locating the remains of persons killed before 10th April 1998 as a result of unlawful acts of violence committed on behalf of, or in connection with, proscribed organisations; and for connected purposes.}} |- | {{|Health Act 1999|public|8|30-06-1999|maintained=y|An Act to amend the law about the national health service; make provision in relation to arrangements and payments between health service bodies and local authorities with respect to health and health-related functions; confer power to regulate any professions concerned (wholly or partly) with the physical or mental health of individuals; and for connected purposes.}} |- | {{|Water Industry Act 1999|public|9|30-06-1999|maintained=y|An Act to make further provision in relation to England and Wales as to charges in respect of the supply of water and the provision of sewerage services and to make provision in relation to Scotland for the establishment and functions of a Water Industry Commissioner for Scotland; and for connected purposes.}} |- | {{|Tax Credits Act 1999|public|10|30-06-1999|maintained=y|An Act to provide for family credit and disability working allowance to be known, respectively, as working families' tax credit and disabled person's tax credit; and to make further provision with respect to those credits, including provision for the transfer of functions relating to them.}} |- | {{|Breeding and Sale of Dogs (Welfare) Act 1999|public|11|30-06-1999|maintained=y|An Act to amend and extend certain enactments relating to the commercial breeding and sale of dogs; to regulate the welfare of dogs kept in commercial breeding establishments; to extend powers of inspection; to establish records of dogs kept at such establishments; and for connected purposes.}} |- | {{|Road Traffic (Vehicle Testing) Act 1999|public|12|30-06-1999|maintained=y|An Act to make further provision about the testing of motor vehicles for the purposes of Part II of the Road Traffic Act 1988; and for connected purposes.}} |- | {{|Appropriation Act 1999|public|13|15-07-1999|maintained=y|An Act to apply a sum out of the Consolidated Fund to the service of the year ending on 31st March 2000; to appropriate the supplies granted in this Session of Parliament; and to repeal certain Consolidated Fund and Appropriation Acts.}} |- | {{|Protection of Children Act 1999|public|14|15-07-1999|maintained=y|An Act to require a list to be kept of persons considered unsuitable to work with children; to extend the power to make regulations under section 218(6) of the Education Reform Act 1988; to make further provision with respect to that list and the list kept for the purposes of such regulations; to enable the protection afforded to children to be afforded to persons suffering from mental impairment; and for connected purposes.}} |- | {{|Trustee Delegation Act 1999|public|15|15-07-1999|maintained=y|An Act to amend the law relating to the delegation of trustee functions by power of attorney and the exercise of such functions by the donee of a power of attorney; and to make provision about the authority of the donee of a power of attorney to act in relation to land.}} |- | {{|Finance Act 1999|public|16|27-07-1999|maintained=y|An Act to grant certain duties, to alter other duties, and to amend the law relating to the National Debt and the Public Revenue, and to make further provision in connection with Finance.}} |- | {{|Disability Rights Commission Act 1999|public|17|27-07-1999|maintained=y|An Act to establish a Disability Rights Commission and make provision as to its functions; and for connected purposes.}} |- | {{|Adoption (Intercountry Aspects) Act 1999|public|18|27-07-1999|maintained=y|An Act to make provision for giving effect to the Convention on Protection of Children and Co-operation in respect of Intercountry Adoption, concluded at the Hague on 29th May 1993; to make further provision in relation to adoptions with an international element; and for connected purposes.}} |- | {{|Company and Business Names (Chamber of Commerce, Etc.) Act 1999|public|19|27-07-1999|maintained=y|An Act to make provision concerning the approval of company or business names containing the expression "chamber of commerce" or any related expression; and for connected purposes.}} |- | {{|Commonwealth Development Corporation Act 1999|public|20|27-07-1999|maintained=y|An Act to make provision about the Commonwealth Development Corporation.}} |- | {{|Football (Offences and Disorder) Act 1999|public|21|27-07-1999|maintained=y|An Act to make further provision in relation to football-related offences; to make further provision for the purpose of preventing violence or disorder at or in connection with football matches; and for connected purposes.}} |- | {{|Access to Justice Act 1999|public|22|27-07-1999|maintained=y|An Act to establish the Legal Services Commission, the Community Legal Service and the Criminal Defence Service; to amend the law of legal aid in Scotland; to make further provision about legal services; to make provision about appeals, courts, judges and court proceedings; to amend the law about magistrates and magistrates' courts; and to make provision about immunity from action and costs and indemnities for certain officials exercising judicial functions.}} |- | {{|Youth Justice and Criminal Evidence Act 1999|public|23|27-07-1999|maintained=y|An Act to provide for the referral of offenders under 18 to youth offender panels; to make provision in connection with the giving of evidence or information for the purposes of criminal proceedings; to amend section 51 of the Criminal Justice and Public Order Act 1994; to make pre-consolidation amendments relating to youth justice; and for connected purposes.}} |- | {{|Pollution Prevention and Control Act 1999|public|24|27-07-1999|maintained=y|An Act to make provision for implementing Council Directive 96/61/EC and for otherwise preventing and controlling pollution; to make provision about certain expired or expiring disposal or waste management licences; and for connected purposes.}} |- | {{|Criminal Cases Review (Insanity) Act 1999|public|25|27-07-1999|maintained=y|An Act to make provision enabling verdicts of guilty but insane to be referred to and reviewed by the Court of Appeal.}} |- | {{|Employment Relations Act 1999|public|26|27-07-1999|maintained=y|An Act to amend the law relating to employment, to trade unions and to employment agencies and businesses.}} |- | {{|Local Government Act 1999|public|27|27-07-1999|maintained=y|An Act to make provision imposing on local and certain other authorities requirements relating to economy, efficiency and effectiveness; and to make provision for the regulation of council tax and precepts.}} |- | {{|Food Standards Act 1999|public|28|11-11-1999|maintained=y|An Act to establish the Food Standards Agency and make provision as to its functions; to amend the law relating to food safety and other interests of consumers in relation to food; to enable provision to be made in relation to the notification of tests for food-borne diseases; to enable provision to be made in relation to animal feedingstuffs; and for connected purposes.}} |- | {{|Greater London Authority Act 1999|public|29|11-11-1999|maintained=y|An Act to establish and make provision about the Greater London Authority, the Mayor of London and the London Assembly; to make provision in relation to London borough councils and the Common Council of the City of London with respect to matters consequential on the establishment of the Greater London Authority; to make provision with respect to the functions of other local authorities and statutory bodies exercising functions in Greater London; to make provision about transport and road traffic in and around Greater London; to make provision about policing in Greater London and to make an adjustment of the metropolitan police district; and for connected purposes.}} |- | {{|Welfare Reform and Pensions Act 1999|public|30|11-11-1999|maintained=y|An Act to make provision about pensions and social security; to make provision for reducing under-occupation of dwellings by housing benefit claimants; to authorise certain expenditure by the Secretary of State having responsibility for social security; and for connected purposes.}} |- | {{|Contracts (Rights of Third Parties) Act 1999|public|31|11-11-1999|maintained=y|An Act to make provision for the enforcement of contractual terms by third parties.}} |- | {{|Mental Health (Amendment) (Scotland) Act 1999|public|32|11-11-1999|maintained=y|An Act to authorise hospital managers to continue to hold, expend and dispose of the property of persons to whom section 94(1) of the Mental Health (Scotland) Act 1984 no longer applies.}} |- | {{|Immigration and Asylum Act 1999|public|33|11-11-1999|maintained=y|An Act to make provision about immigration and asylum; to make provision about procedures in connection with marriage on superintendent registrar's certificate; and for connected purposes.}} |- | {{|House of Lords Act 1999|public|34|11-11-1999|maintained=y|An Act to restrict membership of the House of Lords by virtue of a hereditary peerage; to make related provision about disqualifications for voting at elections to, and for membership of, the House of Commons; and for connected purposes.}} }}

== Local acts ==
{{legislationuk|act |- | {{|City of Westminster Act 1999|local|1|25-03-1999|maintained=y|An Act to make further provision for the control of street trading in the City of Westminster; and for related purposes.}} |- | {{|University College London Act 1999|local|2|30-06-1999|maintained=y|An Act to unite the Eastman Dental Institute with University College London; to transfer all rights, properties and liabilities from the Institute to the College; and for connected and other purposes.}} |- | {{|Imperial College Act 1999|local|3|30-06-1999|maintained=y|An Act to unite Wye College with the Imperial College of Science, Technology and Medicine; to transfer all rights, properties, assets and liabilities from Wye College to the said Imperial College; and for connected purposes.}} |- | {{|HFC Bank Act 1999|local|4|30-06-1999|maintained=y|An Act to provide for the transfer to HFC Bank plc and Household International (U.K.) Limited of the business of Beneficial Bank PLC; and for connected purposes.}} }}
